= Differentiable stack =

Concept in differential geometry

A differentiable stack is the analogue in differential geometry of an algebraic stack in algebraic geometry. It can be described either as a stack over differentiable manifolds which admits an atlas, or as a Lie groupoid up to Morita equivalence.

Differentiable stacks are particularly useful to handle spaces with singularities (i.e. orbifolds, leaf spaces, quotients), which appear naturally in differential geometry but are not differentiable manifolds. For instance, differentiable stacks have applications in foliation theory, Poisson geometry and twisted K-theory.

== Definition ==
=== Definition 1 (via groupoid fibrations) ===
Recall that a category fibred in groupoids (also called a groupoid fibration) consists of a category $\mathcal{C}$ together with a functor $\pi: \mathcal{C} \to \mathrm{Mfd}$ to the category of differentiable manifolds such that

1. $\mathcal{C}$ is a fibred category, i.e. for any object $u$ of $\mathcal{C}$ and any arrow $V \to U$ of $\mathrm{Mfd}$ there is an arrow $v \to u$ lying over $V \to U$;
2. for every commutative triangle $W \to V \to U$ in $\mathrm{Mfd}$ and every arrows $w \to u$ over $W \to U$ and $v \to u$ over $V \to U$, there exists a unique arrow $w \to v$ over $W \to V$ making the triangle $w \to v \to u$ commute.

These properties ensure that, for every object $U$ in $\mathrm{Mfd}$, one can define its fibre, denoted by $\pi^{-1}(U)$ or $\mathcal{C}_U$, as the subcategory of $\mathcal{C}$ made up by all objects of $\mathcal{C}$ lying over $U$ and all morphisms of $\mathcal{C}$ lying over $id_U$. By construction, $\pi^{-1}(U)$ is a groupoid, thus explaining the name. A stack is a groupoid fibration satisfied further glueing properties, expressed in terms of descent.

Any manifold $X$ defines its slice category $F_X = \mathrm{Hom}_{\mathrm{Mfd}} (-, X)$, whose objects are pairs $(U,f)$ of a manifold $U$ and a smooth map $f: U \to X$; then $F_X \to \mathrm{Mfd}, (U,f) \mapsto U$ is a groupoid fibration which is actually also a stack. A morphism $\mathcal{C} \to \mathcal{D}$ of groupoid fibrations is called a representable submersion if

- for every manifold $U$ and any morphism $F_U \to \mathcal{D}$, the fibred product $\mathcal{C} \times_{\mathcal{D}} F_U$ is representable, i.e. it is isomorphic to $F_V$ (for some manifold $V$) as groupoid fibrations;
- the induced smooth map $V \to U$ is a submersion.

A differentiable stack is a stack $\pi: \mathcal{C} \to \mathrm{Mfd}$ together with a special kind of representable submersion $F_X \to \mathcal{C}$ (every submersion $V \to U$ described above is asked to be surjective), for some manifold $X$. The map $F_X \to \mathcal{C}$ is called atlas, presentation or cover of the stack $X$.

=== Definition 2 (via 2-functors) ===
Recall that a prestack (of groupoids) on a category $\mathcal{C}$, also known as a 2-presheaf, is a 2-functor $X: \mathcal{C}^\text{opp} \to \mathrm{Grp}$, where $\mathrm{Grp}$ is the 2-category of (set-theoretical) groupoids, their morphisms, and the natural transformations between them. A stack is a prestack satisfying further glueing properties (analogously to the glueing properties satisfied by a sheaf). In order to state such properties precisely, one needs to define (pre)stacks on a site, i.e. a category equipped with a Grothendieck topology.

Any object $M \in \mathrm{Obj}(\mathcal{C})$ defines a stack $\underline{M} := \mathrm{Hom}_{\mathcal{C}}(-,M)$, which associated to another object $N \in \mathrm{Obj}(\mathcal{C})$ the groupoid $\mathrm{Hom}_{\mathcal{C}}(N,M)$ of morphisms from $N$ to $M$. A stack $X: \mathcal{C}^\text{opp} \to \mathrm{Grp}$ is called geometric if there is an object $M \in \mathrm{Obj}(\mathcal{C})$ and a morphism of stacks $\underline{M} \to X$ (often called atlas, presentation or cover of the stack $X$) such that

- the morphism $\underline{M} \to X$ is representable, i.e. for every object $Y$ in $\mathcal{C}$ and any morphism $Y \to X$ the fibred product $\underline{M} \times_X \underline{Y}$ is isomorphic to $\underline{Z}$ (for some object $Z$) as stacks;
- the induces morphism $Z \to Y$ satisfies a further property depending on the category $\mathcal{C}$ (e.g., for manifold it is asked to be a submersion).

A differentiable stack is a stack on $\mathcal{C} = \mathrm{Mfd}$, the category of differentiable manifolds (viewed as a site with the usual open covering topology), i.e. a 2-functor $X: \mathrm{Mfd}^\text{opp} \to \mathrm{Grp}$, which is also geometric, i.e. admits an atlas $\underline{M} \to X$ as described above.

Note that, replacing $\mathrm{Mfd}$ with the category of affine schemes, one recovers the standard notion of algebraic stack. Similarly, replacing $\mathrm{Mfd}$ with the category of topological spaces, one obtains the definition of topological stack.

=== Definition 3 (via Morita equivalences) ===
Recall that a Lie groupoid consists of two differentiable manifolds $G$ and $M$, together with two surjective submersions $s,t: G \to M$, as well as a partial multiplication map $m: G \times_M G \to G$, a unit map $u: M \to G$, and an inverse map $i: G \to G$, satisfying group-like compatibilities.

Two Lie groupoids $G \rightrightarrows M$ and $H \rightrightarrows N$ are Morita equivalent if there is a principal bi-bundle $P$ between them, i.e. a principal right $H$-bundle $P \to M$, a principal left $G$-bundle $P \to N$, such that the two actions on $P$ commutes. Morita equivalence is an equivalence relation between Lie groupoids, weaker than isomorphism but strong enough to preserve many geometric properties.

A differentiable stack, denoted as $[M/G]$, is the Morita equivalence class of some Lie groupoid $G \rightrightarrows M$.

=== Equivalence between the definitions 1 and 2 ===
Any fibred category $\mathcal{C} \to \mathrm{Mdf}$ defines the 2-sheaf $X: \mathrm{Mdf}^{opp} \to \mathrm{Grp}, U \mapsto \pi^{-1}(U)$. Conversely, any prestack $X: \mathrm{Mdf}^\text{opp} \to \mathrm{Grp}$ gives rise to a category $\mathcal{C}$, whose objects are pairs $(U,x)$ of a manifold $U$ and an object $x \in X(U)$, and whose morphisms are maps $\phi: (U,x) \to (V,y)$ such that $X (\phi) (y) = x$. Such $\mathcal{C}$ becomes a fibred category with the functor $\mathcal{C} \to \mathrm{Mdf}, (U,x) \mapsto U$.

The glueing properties defining a stack in the first and in the second definition are equivalent; similarly, an atlas in the sense of Definition 1 induces an atlas in the sense of Definition 2 and vice versa.

=== Equivalence between the definitions 2 and 3 ===
Every Lie groupoid $G \rightrightarrows M$ gives rise to the differentiable stack $BG: \mathrm{Mfd}^\text{opp} \to \mathrm{Grp}$, which sends any manifold $N$ to the category of $G$-torsors on $N$ (i.e. $G$-principal bundles). Any other Lie groupoid in the Morita class of $G \rightrightarrows M$ induces an isomorphic stack.

Conversely, any differentiable stack $X: \mathrm{Mfd}^\text{opp} \to \mathrm{Grp}$ is of the form $BG$, i.e. it can be represented by a Lie groupoid. More precisely, if $\underline{M} \to X$ is an atlas of the stack $X$, then one defines the Lie groupoid $G_X:= M \times_{X} M \rightrightarrows M$ and checks that $BG_X$ is isomorphic to $X$.

A theorem by Dorette Pronk states an equivalence of bicategories between differentiable stacks according to the first definition and Lie groupoids up to Morita equivalence.

== Examples ==
- Any manifold $M$ defines a differentiable stack $\underline{M} := \mathrm{Hom}_{\mathrm{Hom}}(-,M)$, which is trivially presented by the identity morphism $\underline{M} \to \underline{M}$. The stack $\underline{M}$ corresponds to the Morita equivalence class of the unit groupoid $u(M) \rightrightarrows M$.
- Any Lie group $G$ defines a differentiable stack $BG$, which sends any manifold $N$ to the category of $G$-principal bundle on $N$. It is presented by the trivial stack morphism $\underline{pt} \to BG$, sending a point to the universal $G$-bundle over the classifying space of $G$. The stack $BG$ corresponds to the Morita equivalence class of $G \rightrightarrows \{ *\}$ seen as a Lie groupoid over a point (i.e., the Morita equivalence class of any transitive Lie groupoids with isotropy $G$).
- Any foliation $\mathcal{F}$ on a manifold $M$ defines a differentiable stack via its leaf spaces. It corresponds to the Morita equivalence class of the holonomy groupoid $\mathrm{Hol} (\mathcal{F}) \rightrightarrows M$.
- Any orbifold is a differentiable stack, since it is the Morita equivalence class of a proper Lie groupoid with discrete isotropies (hence finite, since isotropies of proper Lie groupoids are compact).

=== Quotient differentiable stack ===
Given a Lie group action $a: M \times G \to M$ on $M$, its quotient (differentiable) stack is the differential counterpart of the quotient (algebraic) stack in algebraic geometry. It is defined as the stack $[M/G]$ associating to any manifold $X$ the category of principal $G$-bundles $P \to X$ and $G$-equivariant maps $\phi: P \to M$. It is a differentiable stack presented by the stack morphism $\underline{M} \to [M/G]$ defined for any manifold $X$ as

$$\underline{M}(X) = \mathrm{Hom}(X,M) \to [M/G](X), \quad f \mapsto (X \times G \to X, \phi_f)$$

where $\phi_f: X \times G \to M$ is the $G$-equivariant map $\phi_f = a \circ (f \circ \mathrm{pr}_1, \mathrm{pr}_2): (x,g) \mapsto f(x) \cdot g$.

The stack $[M/G]$ corresponds to the Morita equivalence class of the action groupoid $M \times G \rightrightarrows M$. Accordingly, one recovers the following particular cases:

- if $M$ is a point, the differentiable stack $[M/G]$ coincides with $BG$
- if the action is free and proper (and therefore the quotient $M/G$ is a manifold), the differentiable stack $[M/G]$ coincides with $\underline{M/G}$
- if the action is proper (and therefore the quotient $M/G$ is an orbifold), the differentiable stack $[M/G]$ coincides with the stack defined by the orbifold

== Differential space ==
A differentiable space is a differentiable stack with trivial stabilizers. For example, if a Lie group acts freely but not necessarily properly on a manifold, then the quotient by it is in general not a manifold but a differentiable space.

== With Grothendieck topology ==
A differentiable stack $X$ may be equipped with Grothendieck topology in a certain way (see the reference). This gives the notion of a sheaf over $X$. For example, the sheaf $\Omega_X^p$ of differential $p$-forms over $X$ is given by, for any $x$ in $X$ over a manifold $U$, letting $\Omega_X^p(x)$ be the space of $p$-forms on $U$. The sheaf $\Omega_X^0$ is called the structure sheaf on $X$ and is denoted by $\mathcal{O}_X$. $\Omega_X^*$ comes with exterior derivative and thus is a complex of sheaves of vector spaces over $X$: one thus has the notion of de Rham cohomology of $X$.

== Gerbes ==
An epimorphism between differentiable stacks $G \to X$ is called a gerbe over $X$ if $G \to G \times_X G$ is also an epimorphism. For example, if $X$ is a stack, $BS^1 \times X \to X$ is a gerbe. A theorem of Giraud says that $H^2(X, S^1)$ corresponds one-to-one to the set of gerbes over $X$ that are locally isomorphic to $BS^1 \times X \to X$ and that come with trivializations of their bands.
