= Sheaf on an algebraic stack =

In algebraic geometry, a quasi-coherent sheaf on an algebraic stack $\mathfrak{X}$ is a generalization of a quasi-coherent sheaf on a scheme. The most concrete description is that it is a data that consists of, for each a scheme S in the base category and $\xi$ in $\mathfrak{X}(S)$, a quasi-coherent sheaf $F_{\xi}$ on S together with maps implementing the compatibility conditions among $F_{\xi}$'s.

For a Deligne–Mumford stack, there is a simpler description in terms of a presentation $U \to \mathfrak{X}$: a quasi-coherent sheaf on $\mathfrak{X}$ is one obtained by descending a quasi-coherent sheaf on U. A quasi-coherent sheaf on a Deligne–Mumford stack generalizes an orbibundle (in a sense).

Constructible sheaves (e.g., as ℓ-adic sheaves) can also be defined on an algebraic stack and they appear as coefficients of cohomology of a stack.

== Definition ==
The following definition is (Arbarello, Cornalba & Griffiths 2011, Ch. XIII., Definition 2.1.)

Let $\mathfrak{X}$ be a category fibered in groupoids over the category of schemes of finite type over a field with the structure functor p. Then a quasi-coherent sheaf on $\mathfrak{X}$ is the data consisting of:

1. for each object $\xi$, a quasi-coherent sheaf $F_{\xi}$ on the scheme $p(\xi)$,
2. for each morphism $H: \xi \to \eta$ in $\mathfrak{X}$ and $h = p(H): p(\xi) \to p(\eta)$ in the base category, an isomorphism
  $$\rho_H: h^*(F_{\eta}) \overset{\simeq}\to F_{\xi}$$

satisfying the cocycle condition: for each pair $H_1: \xi_1 \to \xi_2, H_2: \xi_2 \to \xi_3$,

$h_1^* h_2^* F_{\xi_3} \overset{h_1^* (\rho_{H_2})} \to h_1^* F_{\xi_2} \overset{\rho_{H_1}}\to F_{\xi_1}$ equals $h_1^* h_2^* F_{\xi_3} \overset{\sim}= (h_2 \circ h_1)^* F_{\xi_3} \overset{\rho_{H_2 \circ H_1}}\to F_{\xi_1}$.

(cf. equivariant sheaf.)

== Examples ==
- The Hodge bundle on the moduli stack of algebraic curves of fixed genus.

== ℓ-adic formalism ==
The ℓ-adic formalism (theory of ℓ-adic sheaves) extends to algebraic stacks.

== See also ==
- Hopf algebroid - encodes the data of quasi-coherent sheaves on a prestack presentable as a groupoid internal to affine schemes (or projective schemes using graded Hopf algebroids)
