= Moduli stack of principal bundles =

In algebraic geometry, given a smooth projective curve X over a finite field $\mathbf{F}_q$ and a smooth affine group scheme G over it, the moduli stack of principal bundles over X, denoted by $\operatorname{Bun}_G(X)$, is an algebraic stack given by: for any $\mathbf{F}_q$-algebra R,

$\operatorname{Bun}_G(X)(R)=$ the category of principal G-bundles over the relative curve $X \times_{\mathbf{F}_q} \operatorname{Spec}R$.

In particular, the category of $\mathbf{F}_q$-points of $\operatorname{Bun}_G(X)$, that is, $\operatorname{Bun}_G(X)(\mathbf{F}_q)$, is the category of G-bundles over X.

Similarly, $\operatorname{Bun}_G(X)$ can also be defined when the curve X is over the field of complex numbers. Roughly, in the complex case, one can define $\operatorname{Bun}_G(X)$ as the quotient stack of the space of holomorphic connections on X by the gauge group. Replacing the quotient stack (which is not a topological space) by a homotopy quotient (which is a topological space) gives the homotopy type of $\operatorname{Bun}_G(X)$.

In the finite field case, it is not common to define the homotopy type of $\operatorname{Bun}_G(X)$. But one can still define a (smooth) cohomology and homology of $\operatorname{Bun}_G(X)$.

== Basic properties ==
It is known that $\operatorname{Bun}_G(X)$ is a smooth stack of dimension $(g(X) - 1) \dim G$ where $g(X)$ is the genus of X. It is not of finite type but locally of finite type; one thus usually uses a stratification by open substacks of finite type (cf. the Harder–Narasimhan stratification), also for parahoric G over curve X see and for G only a flat group scheme of finite type over X see.

If G is a split reductive group, then the set of connected components $\pi_0(\operatorname{Bun}_G(X))$ is in a natural bijection with the fundamental group $\pi_1(G)$.

== Behrend's trace formula ==
This is a (conjectural) version of the Lefschetz trace formula for $\operatorname{Bun}_G(X)$ when X is over a finite field, introduced by Behrend in 1993. It states: if G is a smooth affine group scheme with semisimple connected generic fiber, then

$$\# \operatorname{Bun}_G(X)(\mathbf{F}_q) = q^{\dim \operatorname{Bun}_G(X)} \operatorname{tr} (\phi^{-1}|H^*(\operatorname{Bun}_G(X); \mathbb{Z}_l))$$

where (see also Behrend's trace formula for the details)

- l is a prime number that is not p and the ring $\mathbb{Z}_l$ of l-adic integers is viewed as a subring of $\mathbb{C}$.
- $\phi$ is the geometric Frobenius.
- $\# \operatorname{Bun}_G(X)(\mathbf{F}_q) = \sum_P {1 \over \# \operatorname{Aut}(P)}$, the sum running over all isomorphism classes of G-bundles on X and convergent.
- $\operatorname{tr}(\phi^{-1}|V_*) = \sum_{i = 0}^\infty (-1)^i \operatorname{tr}(\phi^{-1}|V_i)$ for a graded vector space $V_*$, provided the series on the right absolutely converges.

A priori, neither left nor right side in the formula converges. Thus, the formula states that the two sides converge to finite numbers and that those numbers coincide.

== See also ==
- Geometric Langlands conjectures
- Ran space
- Moduli stack of vector bundles
