= Group stack =

In algebraic geometry, a group stack is an algebraic stack whose categories of points have group structures or even groupoid structures in a compatible way. It generalizes a group scheme, which is a scheme whose sets of points have group structures in a compatible way.

== Examples ==
- A group scheme is a group-\ stack. More generally, a group algebraic-space, an algebraic-space analog of a group scheme, is a group-stack.
- Over a field k, a vector bundle stack $\mathcal{V}$ on a Deligne–Mumford stack X is a group-stack such that there is a vector bundle V over k on X and a presentation $V \to \mathcal{V}$. It has an action by the affine line $\mathbb{A}^1$ corresponding to scalar multiplication.
- A Picard stack is an example of a group-stack (or groupoid-stack).

== Actions of group stacks ==
The definition of a group action of a group stack is a bit tricky. First, given an algebraic stack X and a group scheme G on a base scheme S, a right action of G on X consists of

1. a morphism $\sigma: X \times G \to X$,
2. (associativity) a natural isomorphism $\sigma \circ (m \times 1_X) \overset{\sim}\to \sigma \circ (1_X \times \sigma)$, where m is the multiplication on G,
3. (identity) a natural isomorphism $1_X \overset{\sim}\to \sigma \circ (1_X \times e)$, where $e: S \to G$ is the identity section of G,

that satisfy the typical compatibility conditions.

If, more generally, G is a group stack, one then extends the above using local presentations.
