= Group-scheme action =

In algebraic geometry, an action of a group scheme is a generalization of a group action to a group scheme. Precisely, given a group S-scheme G, a left action of G on an S-scheme X is an S-morphism

$$\sigma: G \times_S X \to X$$

such that

- (associativity) $\sigma \circ (1_G \times \sigma) = \sigma \circ (m \times 1_X)$, where $m: G \times_S G \to G$ is the group law,
- (unitality) $\sigma \circ (e \times 1_X) = 1_X$, where $e: S \to G$ is the identity section of G.

A right action of G on X is defined analogously. A scheme equipped with a left or right action of a group scheme G is called a G-scheme. An equivariant morphism between G-schemes is a morphism of schemes that intertwines the respective G-actions.

More generally, one can also consider (at least some special case of) an action of a group functor: viewing G as a functor, an action is given as a natural transformation satisfying the conditions analogous to the above. Alternatively, some authors study group action in the language of a groupoid; a group-scheme action is then an example of a groupoid scheme.

== Constructs ==
The usual constructs for a group action such as orbits generalize to a group-scheme action. Let $\sigma$ be a given group-scheme action as above.

- Given a T-valued point $x: T \to X$, the orbit map $\sigma_x: G \times_S T \to X \times_S T$ is given as $(\sigma \circ (1_G \times x), p_2)$.
- The orbit of x is the image of the orbit map $\sigma_x$.
- The stabilizer of x is the fiber over $\sigma_x$ of the map $(x, 1_T): T \to X \times_S T.$

== Problem of constructing a quotient ==
Unlike a set-theoretic group action, there is no straightforward way to construct a quotient for a group-scheme action. One exception is the case when the action is free, the case of a principal fiber bundle.

There are several approaches to overcome this difficulty:

- Level structure - Perhaps the oldest, the approach replaces an object to classify by an object together with a level structure
- Geometric invariant theory - throw away bad orbits and then take a quotient. The drawback is that there is no canonical way to introduce the notion of "bad orbits"; the notion depends on a choice of linearization. See also: categorical quotient, GIT quotient.
- Borel construction - this is an approach essentially from algebraic topology; this approach requires one to work with an infinite-dimensional space.
- Analytic approach, the theory of Teichmüller space
- Quotient stack - in a sense, this is the ultimate answer to the problem. Roughly, a "quotient prestack" is the category of orbits and one stackify (i.e., the introduction of the notion of a torsor) it to get a quotient stack.

Depending on applications, another approach would be to shift the focus away from a space then onto stuff on a space; e.g., topos. So the problem shifts from the classification of orbits to that of equivariant objects.

== See also ==
- groupoid scheme
- Sumihiro's theorem
- equivariant sheaf
- Borel fixed-point theorem
