= Moduli stack of vector bundles =

Concept in algebraic geometry

In algebraic geometry, the moduli stack of rank-n vector bundles Vect_{n} is the stack parametrizing vector bundles (or locally free sheaves) of rank n over some reasonable spaces.

It is a smooth algebraic stack of the negative dimension $-n^2$. Moreover, viewing a rank-n vector bundle as a principal $GL_n$-bundle, Vect_{n} is isomorphic to the classifying stack $BGL_n = [\text{pt}/GL_n].$

== Definition ==
For the base category, let C be the category of schemes of finite type over a fixed field k. Then $\operatorname{Vect}_n$ is the category where

1. an object is a pair $(U, E)$ of a scheme U in C and a rank-n vector bundle E over U
2. a morphism $(U, E) \to (V, F)$ consists of $f: U \to V$ in C and a bundle isomorphism $f^* F \overset{\sim}\to E$.

Let $p: \operatorname{Vect}_n \to C$ be the forgetful functor. Via p, $\operatorname{Vect}_n$ is a prestack over C. That it is a stack over C is precisely the statement "vector bundles have the descent property". Note that each fiber $\operatorname{Vect}_n(U) = p^{-1}(U)$ over U is the category of rank-n vector bundles over U where every morphism is an isomorphism (i.e., each fiber of p is a groupoid).

== See also ==
- moduli stack of principal bundles
