= Cartesian fibration =

In mathematics, especially homotopy theory, a cartesian fibration is, roughly, a map so that every lift exists that is a final object among all lifts. For example, the forgetful functor

$$\textrm{QCoh} \to \textrm{Sch}$$

from the category of pairs $(X, F)$ of schemes and quasi-coherent sheaves on them is a cartesian fibration (see § Basic example). In fact, the Grothendieck construction says all cartesian fibrations are of this type; i.e., they simply forget extra data. See also: fibred category, prestack.

The dual of a cartesian fibration is called an op-fibration; in particular, not a cocartesian fibration.

A right fibration between simplicial sets is an example of a cartesian fibration.

== Definition ==
Given a functor $\pi : C \to S$, a morphism $f : x \to y$ in $C$ is called $\pi$-cartesian or simply cartesian if the natural map

$$(f_*, \pi) : \operatorname{Hom}(z, x) \to \operatorname{Hom}(z, y) \times_{\operatorname{Hom}(\pi(z), \pi(y))} \operatorname{Hom}(\pi(z), \pi(x))$$

is bijective. Explicitly, thus, $f : x \to y$ is cartesian if given

- $g: z \to y$ and
- $u : \pi(z) \to \pi(x)$

with $\pi(g) = \pi(f) \circ u$, there exists a unique $g' : z \to x$ in $\pi^{-1}(u)$ such that $f \circ g' = g$.

Then $\pi$ is called a cartesian fibration if for each morphism of the form $f : s \to \pi(z)$ in S, there exists a $\pi$-cartesian morphism $g : a \to z$ in C such that $\pi(g) = f$. Here, the object $a$ is unique up to unique isomorphisms (if $b \to z$ is another lift, there is a unique $b \to a$, which is shown to be an isomorphism). Because of this, the object $a$ is often thought of as the pullback of $z$ and is sometimes even denoted as $f^* z$. Also, somehow informally, $g$ is said to be a final object among all lifts of $f$.

A morphism $\varphi : \pi \to \rho$ between cartesian fibrations over the same base S is a map (functor) over the base; i.e., $\pi = \rho \circ \varphi$ that sends cartesian morphisms to cartesian morphisms. Given $\varphi, \psi : \pi \to \rho$, a 2-morphism $\theta : \varphi \rightarrow \psi$ is an invertible map (map = natural transformation) such that for each object $E$ in the source of $\pi$, $\theta_E : \varphi(E) \to \psi(E)$ maps to the identity map of the object $\rho(\varphi(E)) = \rho(\psi(E))$ under $\rho$.

This way, all the cartesian fibrations over the fixed base category S determine the (2, 1)-category denoted by $\operatorname{Cart}(S)$.

== Basic example ==
Let $\operatorname{QCoh}$ be the category where

- an object is a pair $(X, F)$ of a scheme $X$ and a quasi-coherent sheaf $F$ on it,
- a morphism $\overline{f} : (X, F) \to (Y, G)$ consists of a morphism $f : X \to Y$ of schemes and a sheaf homomorphism $\varphi_f : f^* G \overset{\sim}\to F$ on $X$,
- the composition $\overline{g} \circ \overline{f}$ of $\overline{g} : (Y, G) \to (Z, H)$ and above $\overline{f}$ is the (unique) morphism $\overline{h}$ such that $h = g \circ f$ and $\varphi_h$ is
  $$(g \circ f)^*H \simeq f^* g^* H \overset{f^*\varphi_g}\to f^*G \overset{\varphi_f}\to F.$$

To see the forgetful map

$$\pi : \operatorname{QCoh} \to \operatorname{Sch}$$

is a cartesian fibration, let $f : X \to \pi((Y, G))$ be in $\operatorname{QCoh}$. Take

$$\overline{f} = (f, \varphi_f) : (X, F) \to (Y, G)$$

with $F = f^* G$ and $\varphi_f = \operatorname{id}$. We claim $\overline{f}$ is cartesian. Given $\overline{g} : (Z, H) \to (Y, G)$ and $h : Z \to X$ with $g = f \circ h$, if $\varphi_h$ exists such that $\overline{g} = \overline{f} \circ \overline{h}$, then we have $\varphi_g$ is

$$(f \circ h)^* G \simeq h^* f^* G = h^* F \overset{\varphi_h}\to H.$$

So, the required $\overline{h}$ trivially exists and is unique.

Note some authors consider $\operatorname{QCoh}^{\simeq}$, the core of $\operatorname{QCoh}$ instead. In that case, the forgetful map restricted to it is also a cartesian fibration.

== Grothendieck construction ==
Given a category $S$, the Grothendieck construction gives an equivalence of ∞-categories between $\operatorname{Cart}(S)$ and the ∞-category of prestacks on $S$ (prestacks = category-valued presheaves).

Roughly, the construction goes as follows: given a cartesian fibration $\pi$, we let $F_{\pi} : S^{op} \to \textbf{Cat}$ be the map that sends each object x in S to the fiber $\pi^{-1}(x)$. So, $F_{\pi}$ is a $\textbf{Cat}$-valued presheaf or a prestack. Conversely, given a prestack $F$, define the category $C_F$ where an object is a pair $(x, a)$ with $a \in F(x)$ and then let $\pi$ be the forgetful functor to $S$. Then these two assignments give the claimed equivalence.

For example, if the construction is applied to the forgetful $\pi : \textrm{QCoh} \to \textrm{Sch}$, then we get the map $X \mapsto \textrm{QCoh}(X)$ that sends a scheme $X$ to the category of quasi-coherent sheaves on $X$. Conversely, $\pi$ is determined by such a map.

Lurie's straightening theorem generalizes the above equivalence to the equivalence between the ∞-category of cartesian fibrations over some ∞-category C and the ∞-category of ∞-prestacks on C.

== See also ==
- fibered category
