= Sumihiro =

- Gender: Male

Origin
- Origin: Japanese
- Meaning: Different meanings depending on the kanji used

Sumihiro (written: 澄博 or 純熈) is a masculine Japanese given name. Notable people with the name include:

- Ōmura Sumihiro (大村 純熈; 1830–1882), Japanese daimyō
- Sumihiro Tomii (富井 澄博; 1949–2013), Japanese alpine skier

== See also ==
- Sumihiro's theorem, a theorem in algebraic geometry
