= Artin's criterion =

In mathematics, Artin's criteria are a collection of related necessary and sufficient conditions on deformation functors which prove the representability of these functors as either algebraic spaces or as algebraic stacks. In particular, these conditions are used in the construction of the moduli stack of elliptic curves and the construction of the moduli stack of pointed curves.

== Notation and technical notes ==
Throughout this article, let $S$ be a scheme of finite-type over a field $k$ or an excellent DVR. $p:F \to (Sch/S)$ will be a category fibered in groupoids, $F(X)$ will be the groupoid lying over $X \to S$.

A stack $F$ is called limit preserving if it is compatible with filtered direct limits in $Sch/S$, meaning given a filtered system $\{X_i\}_{i\in I}$ there is an equivalence of categories

$\lim_{\rightarrow}F(X_i) \to F(\lim_{\rightarrow}X_i)$

An element of $x \in F(X)$ is called an algebraic element if it is the henselization of an $\mathcal{O}_S$-algebra of finite type.

A limit preserving stack $F$ over $Sch/S$ is called an algebraic stack if

1. For any pair of elements $x \in F(X), y \in F(Y)$ the fiber product $X\times_F Y$ is represented as an algebraic space
2. There is a scheme $X \to S$ locally of finite type, and an element $x \in F(X)$ which is smooth and surjective such that for any $y \in F(Y)$ the induced map $X\times_F Y \to Y$ is smooth and surjective.

== See also ==
- Artin approximation theorem
- Schlessinger's theorem
