= Quotient space =

Quotient space may refer to a quotient set when the sets under consideration are considered as spaces. In particular:

- Quotient space (topology), in case of topological spaces
- Quotient space (linear algebra), in case of vector spaces
- Quotient space of an algebraic stack
- Quotient metric space

== See also ==
- Quotient object
