= Groupoid object =

In category theory, a branch of mathematics, a groupoid object is both a generalization of a groupoid which is built on richer structures than sets, and a generalization of a group objects when the multiplication is only partially defined.

== Definition ==
A groupoid object in a category C admitting finite fiber products consists of a pair of objects $R, U$ together with five morphisms

$$s, t: R \to U, \ e: U \to R, \ m: R \times_{U, t, s} R \to R, \ i: R \to R$$

satisfying the following groupoid axioms

1. $s \circ e = t \circ e = 1_U, \, s \circ m = s \circ p_1, t \circ m = t \circ p_2$ where the $p_i: R \times_{U, t, s} R \to R$ are the two projections,
2. (associativity) $m \circ (1_R \times m) = m \circ (m \times 1_R),$
3. (unit) $m \circ (e \circ s, 1_R) = m \circ (1_R, e \circ t) = 1_R,$
4. (inverse) $i \circ i = 1_R$, $s \circ i = t, \, t \circ i = s$, $m \circ (1_R, i) = e \circ s, \, m \circ (i, 1_R) = e \circ t$.

== Examples ==
=== Group objects ===
A group object is a special case of a groupoid object, where $R = U$ and $s = t$. One recovers therefore topological groups by taking the category of topological spaces, or Lie groups by taking the category of manifolds, etc.

=== Groupoids ===
A groupoid object in the category of sets is precisely a groupoid in the usual sense: a category in which every morphism is an isomorphism. Indeed, given such a category C, take U to be the set of all objects in C, R the set of all morphisms in C, the five morphisms given by $s(x \to y) = x, \, t(x \to y) = y$, $m(f, g) = g \circ f$, $e(x) = 1_x$ and $i(f) = f^{-1}$. When the term "groupoid" can naturally refer to a groupoid object in some particular category in mind, the term groupoid set is used to refer to a groupoid object in the category of sets.

However, unlike in the previous example with Lie groups, a groupoid object in the category of manifolds is not necessarily a Lie groupoid, since the maps s and t fail to satisfy further requirements (they are not necessarily submersions).

=== Groupoid schemes ===
A groupoid S-scheme is a groupoid object in the category of schemes over some fixed base scheme S. If $U = S$, then a groupoid scheme (where $s = t$ are necessarily the structure map) is the same as a group scheme. A groupoid scheme is also called an algebraic groupoid, to convey the idea it is a generalization of algebraic groups and their actions.

For example, suppose an algebraic group G acts from the right on a scheme U. Then take $R = U \times G$, s the projection, t the given action. This determines a groupoid scheme.

== Constructions ==
Given a groupoid object (R, U), the equalizer of $R \,\overset{s}\underset{t}\rightrightarrows\, U$, if any, is a group object called the inertia group of the groupoid. The coequalizer of the same diagram, if any, is the quotient of the groupoid.

Each groupoid object in a category C (if any) may be thought of as a contravariant functor from C to the category of groupoids. This way, each groupoid object determines a prestack in groupoids. This prestack is not a stack but it can be stackified to yield a stack.

The main use of the notion is that it provides an atlas for a stack. More specifically, let $[R \rightrightarrows U]$ be the category of $(R \rightrightarrows U)$-torsors. Then it is a category fibered in groupoids; in fact (in a nice case), a Deligne–Mumford stack. Conversely, any DM stack is of this form.

== See also ==
- Simplicial scheme
