= Inertia stack =

In mathematics, especially in differential and algebraic geometries, an inertia stack of a groupoid X is a stack that parametrizes automorphism groups on $X$ and transitions between them. It is commonly denoted as $\Lambda X$ and is defined as inertia groupoids as charts. The notion often appears in particular as an inertia orbifold.

== Inertia groupoid ==
Let $U = (U_1 \rightrightarrows U_0)$ be a groupoid. Then the inertia groupoid $\Lambda U$ is a groupoid (= a category whose morphisms are all invertible) where

- the objects are the automorphism groups: $\operatorname{Aut}(x), x \in U_0,$
- the morphisms from x to y are conjugations by invertible morphisms $f : x \to y$; that is, an automorphism $g : x \to x$ is sent to $f \circ g \circ f^{-1} : y \to y,$
- the composition is that of morphisms in $U$.

For example, if U is a fundamental groupoid, then $\Lambda U$ keeps track of the changes of base points.
