= Harder–Narasimhan stratification =

In algebraic geometry and complex geometry, the Harder–Narasimhan stratification is any of a stratification of the moduli stack of principal G-bundles by locally closed substacks in terms of "loci of instabilities". In the original form due to Harder and Narasimhan, G was the general linear group; i.e., the moduli stack was the moduli stack of vector bundles, but, today, the term refers to any of generalizations. The scheme-theoretic version is due to Shatz and so the term "Shatz stratification" is also used synonymously. The general case is due to Behrend.
