= Stacky curve =

Object in algebraic geometry

In mathematics, a stacky curve is an object in algebraic geometry that is roughly an algebraic curve with potentially "fractional points" called stacky points. A stacky curve is a type of stack used in studying Gromov–Witten theory, enumerative geometry, and rings of modular forms.

Stacky curves are closely related to 1-dimensional orbifolds and therefore sometimes called orbifold curves or orbicurves.

== Definition ==
A stacky curve $\mathfrak{X}$ over a field k is a smooth proper geometrically connected Deligne–Mumford stack of dimension 1 over k that contains a dense open subscheme.

== Properties ==
A stacky curve is uniquely determined (up to isomorphism) by its coarse space X (a smooth quasi-projective curve over k), a finite set of points x_{i} (its stacky points) and integers n_{i} (its ramification orders) greater than 1. The canonical divisor of $\mathfrak{X}$ is linearly equivalent to the sum of the canonical divisor of X and a ramification divisor R:

$$K_\mathfrak{X} \sim K_X + R.$$

Letting g be the genus of the coarse space X, the degree of the canonical divisor of $\mathfrak{X}$ is therefore:

$$d = \deg K_\mathfrak{X} = 2g - 2 + \sum_{i=1}^r \frac{n_i - 1}{n_i}.$$

A stacky curve is called hyperbolic if d is positive, Euclidean if d is zero, and spherical if d is negative.

Although the corresponding statement of Riemann–Roch theorem does not hold for stacky curves, there is a generalization of Riemann's existence theorem that gives an equivalence of categories between the category of stacky curves over the complex numbers and the category of complex orbifold curves.

== Applications ==
The generalization of GAGA for stacky curves is used in the derivation of algebraic structure theory of rings of modular forms.

The study of stacky curves is used extensively in equivariant Gromov–Witten theory and enumerative geometry.
