= Toric stack =

In algebraic geometry, a toric stack is a stacky generalization of a toric variety. More precisely, a toric stack is obtained by replacing in the construction of a toric variety a step of taking GIT quotients with that of taking quotient stacks. Consequently, a toric variety is a coarse approximation of a toric stack. A toric orbifold is an example of a toric stack.

== See also ==
- Stanley–Reisner ring
