= Keel–Mori theorem =

In algebraic geometry, the Keel–Mori theorem gives conditions for the existence of the quotient of an algebraic space by a group. The theorem was proved by Sean Keel and Shigefumi Mori (1997).

A consequence of the Keel–Mori theorem is the existence of a coarse moduli space of a separated algebraic stack, which is roughly a "best possible" approximation to the stack by a separated algebraic space.

== Statement ==
All algebraic spaces are assumed of finite type over a locally Noetherian base. Suppose that j:R→X×X is a flat groupoid whose stabilizer j^{−1}Δ is finite over X (where Δ is the diagonal of X×X). The Keel–Mori theorem states that there is an algebraic space that is a geometric and uniform categorical quotient of X by j, which is separated if j is finite.

A corollary is that for any flat group scheme G acting properly on an algebraic space X with finite stabilizers there is a uniform geometric and uniform categorical quotient X/G which is a separated algebraic space. János Kollár (1997) proved a slightly weaker version of this and described several applications.
