= Smooth topology =

In algebraic geometry, the smooth topology is a certain Grothendieck topology which is finer than étale topology. Its main use is to define the cohomology of an algebraic stack with coefficients in, say, the étale sheaf $\mathbb{Q}_l$.

To understand the problem that motivates the notion, consider the classifying stack $B\mathbb{G}_m$ over $\operatorname{Spec} \mathbf{F}_q$. Then $B\mathbb{G}_m = \operatorname{Spec} \mathbf{F}_q$ in the étale topology; i.e., just a point. However, we expect the "correct" cohomology ring of $B\mathbb{G}_m$ to be more like that of $\mathbb{C} P^\infty$ as the ring should classify line bundles. Thus, the cohomology of $B\mathbb{G}_m$ should be defined using smooth topology for formulae like Behrend's fixed point formula to hold.
