= Quotient space of an algebraic stack =

Concept in algebraic geometry

In algebraic geometry, the quotient space of an algebraic stack F, denoted by |F|, is a topological space which as a set is the set of all integral substacks of F and which then is given a "Zariski topology": an open subset has a form $|U| \subset |F|$ for some open substack U of F.

The construction $X \mapsto |X|$ is functorial; i.e., each morphism $f: X \to Y$ of algebraic stacks determines a continuous map $f: |X| \to |Y|$.

An algebraic stack X is punctual if $|X|$ is a point.

When X is a moduli stack, the quotient space $|X|$ is called the moduli space of X. If $f: X \to Y$ is a morphism of algebraic stacks that induces a homeomorphism $f: |X| \overset{\sim}\to |Y|$, then Y is called a coarse moduli stack of X. ("The" coarse moduli requires a universality.)
