= Prestack =

Algebraic geometry category satisfying lifting conditions

In algebraic geometry, a prestack F over a category C equipped with some Grothendieck topology is a category together with a functor p: F → C satisfying a certain lifting condition and such that (when the fibers are groupoids) locally isomorphic objects are isomorphic. A stack is a prestack with effective descents, meaning local objects may be patched together to become a global object.

Prestacks that appear in nature are typically stacks but some naively constructed prestacks (e.g., groupoid scheme or the prestack of projectivized vector bundles) may not be stacks. Prestacks may be studied on their own or passed to stacks.

Since a stack is a prestack, all the results on prestacks are valid for stacks as well. Throughout the article, we work with a fixed base category C; for example, C can be the category of all schemes over some fixed scheme equipped with some Grothendieck topology.

== Informal definition ==
Let F be a category and suppose it is fibered over C through the functor $p: F \to C$; this means that one can construct pullbacks along morphisms in C, up to canonical isomorphisms.

Given an object U in C and objects x, y in $F(U) = p^{-1}(U)$, for each morphism $f: V \to U$ in C, after fixing pullbacks $f^*x, f^*y$, we let

$$\underline{\operatorname{Hom}}(x, y)(V \overset{f}\to U) = [\operatorname{Hom}(f^*x, f^*y)]$$

be the set of all morphisms from $f^* x$ to $f^* y$; here, the bracket means we canonically identify different Hom sets resulting from different choices of pullbacks. For each $g: W \to V$ over U, define the restriction map from f to g: $\underline{\operatorname{Hom}}(x, y)(V \overset{f}\to U) \to \underline{\operatorname{Hom}}(x, y)(W \overset{f \circ g}\to U)$ to be the composition

$$[\operatorname{Hom}(f^* x, f^*y)] \overset{g^*}\to [\operatorname{Hom}(g^* (f^* x), g^* (f^*y))] = [\operatorname{Hom}((f \circ g)^* x, (f \circ g)^*y)]$$

where a canonical isomorphism $g^* \circ f^* \simeq (f \circ g)^*$ is used to get the = on the right. Then $\underline{\operatorname{Hom}}(x, y)$ is a presheaf on the slice category $C_{/U}$, the category of all morphisms in C with target U.

By definition, F is a prestack if, for each pair x, y, $\underline{\operatorname{Hom}}(x, y)$ is a sheaf of sets with respect to the induced Grothendieck topology on $C_{/U}$.

This definition can be equivalently phrased as follows. First, for each covering family $\{ V_i \to U \}$, we "define" the category $F(\{ V_i \to U \})$ as a category where: writing $p_1: V_i \times_U V_j \to V_i, \, p_{12}: V_i \times_U V_j \times_U V_k \to V_i \times_U V_j$, etc.,

1. an object is a set $\{ (x_i, \varphi_{ij}) \}$ of pairs consisting of objects $x_i$ in $F(V_i)$ and isomorphisms $\varphi_{ij}: p_2^* x_j \overset{\sim}\to p_1^* x_i$ that satisfy the cocycle condition: $p_{13}^* \varphi_{ik} = p_{12}^* \varphi_{ij} \circ p_{23}^* \varphi_{jk}$
2. a morphism $\{ (x_i, \varphi_{ij}) \} \to \{ (y_i, \psi_{ij}) \}$ consists of $\alpha_i: x_i \to y_i$ in $F(V_i)$ such that$\psi_{ij} \circ p_2^* \alpha_j = p_1^* \alpha_i \circ \varphi_{ij}.$

An object of this category is called a descent datum. This category is not well-defined; the issue is that the pullbacks are determined only up to canonical isomorphisms; similarly fiber products are defined only up to canonical isomorphisms, despite the notational practice to the contrary. In practice, one simply makes some canonical identifications of pullbacks, their compositions, fiber products, etc.; up to such identifications, the above category is well-defined (in other words, it is defined up to a canonical equivalence of categories.)

There is an obvious functor $F(U) \to F(\{ V_i \to U \})$ that sends an object to the descent datum that it defines. One can then say: F is a prestack if and only if, for each covering family $\{ V_i \to U \}$, the functor $F(U) \to F(\{ V_i \to U \})$ is fully faithful. A statement like this is independent of choices of canonical identifications mentioned early.

The essential image of $F(U) \to F(\{ V_i \to U \})$ consists precisely of effective descent data (just the definition of "effective"). Thus, F is a stack if and only if, for each covering family $\{ V_i \to U \}$, $F(U) \to F(\{ V_i \to U \})$ is an equivalence of categories.

These reformulations of the definitions of prestacks and stacks make intuitive meanings of those concepts very explicit: (1) "fibered category" means one can construct a pullback (2) "prestack in groupoids" additionally means "locally isomorphic" implies "isomorphic" (3) "stack in groupoids" means, in addition to the previous properties, a global object can be constructed from local data subject to cocycle conditions. All these work up to canonical isomorphisms.

== Morphisms ==
=== Definitions ===
Given prestacks $p: F \to C, q: G \to C$ over the fixed base category C, a morphism $f: F \to G$ is a functor such that (1) $q \circ f = p$ and (2) it maps cartesian morphisms to cartesian morphisms. Note (2) is automatic if G is fibered in groupoids; e.g., an algebraic stack (since all morphisms are cartesian then.)

If $p: F_S \to C$ is the stack associated to a scheme S in the base category C, then the fiber $p^{-1}(U) = F_S(U)$ is, by construction, the set of all morphisms from U to S in C. Analogously, given a scheme U in C viewed as a stack (i.e., $F_U$) and a category F fibered in groupoids over C, the 2-Yoneda lemma says: there is a natural equivalence of categories

$$\operatorname{Funct}_C(U, F) \overset{\chi \mapsto \chi(1_U)}\to F(U)$$

where $\operatorname{Funct}_C$ refers to the relative functor category; the objects are the functors from U to F over C and the morphisms are the base-preserving natural transformations.

=== Fiber product ===
Let $f: F \to B, g: G \to B$ be morphisms of prestacks. Then, by definition, the fiber product $F \times_{B, f, g} G = F \times_B G$ is the category where

1. an object is a triple $(x, y, \psi)$ consisting of an object x in F, an object y in G, both over the same object in C, and an isomorphism $\psi: f(x) \overset{\sim}\to g(y)$ in G over the identity morphism in C, and
2. a morphism $(x, y, \psi) \to (x', y', \psi')$ consists of $\alpha: x \to x'$ in F, $\beta: y \to y'$ in G, both over the same morphism in C, such that $g(\beta) \circ \psi = \psi' \circ f(\alpha)$.

It comes with the forgetful functors p, q from $F \times_B G$ to F and G.

This fiber product behaves like a usual fiber product but up to natural isomorphisms. The meaning of this is the following. Firstly, the obvious square does not commute; instead, for each object $(x, y, \psi)$ in $F \times_B G$:

$$\psi: (f \circ p)(x, y, \psi) = f(x) \overset{\sim}\to g(y) = (g \circ q)(x, y, \psi)$$.

That is, there is an invertible natural transformation (= natural isomorphism)

$$\Psi: f \circ p \overset{\sim}\to g \circ q$$.

Secondly, it satisfies the strict universal property: given a prestack H, morphisms $u: H \to F$, $v: H \to G$, a natural isomorphism $f \circ u \overset{\sim}\to g \circ v$, there exists a $w: H \to F \times_B G$ together with natural isomorphisms $u \overset{\sim}\to p \circ w$ and $q \circ w \overset{\sim}\to v$ such that $f \circ u \overset{\sim}\to g \circ v$ is $f \circ p \circ w \overset{\sim}\to g \circ q \circ w$. In general, a fiber product of F and G over B is a prestack canonically isomorphic to $F \times_B G$ above.

When B is the base category C (the prestack over itself), B is dropped and one simply writes $F \times G$. Note, in this case, $\psi$ in objects are all identities.

Example: For each prestack $p: X \to C$, there is the diagonal morphism $\Delta: X \to X \times X$ given by $x \mapsto (x, x, 1_{p(x)})$.

Example: Given $F_i \to B_i, G_i \to B_i, \, i = 1, 2$, $(F_1 \times F_2) \times_{B_1 \times B_2} (G_1 \times G_2) \simeq (F_1 \times_{B_1} G_1) \times (F_2 \times_{B_2} G_2)$.

Example: Given $f: F \to B, g: G \to B$ and the diagonal morphism $\Delta: B \to B \times B$,

$$F \times_B G \simeq (F \times G) \times_{B \times B, f \times g, \Delta} B$$;

this isomorphism is constructed simply by hand.

=== Representable morphisms ===
A morphism of prestacks $f: X \to Y$ is said to be strongly representable if, for every morphism $S \to Y$ from a scheme S in C viewed as a prestack, the fiber product $X \times_Y S$ of prestacks is a scheme in C.

In particular, the definition applies to the structure map $p: X \to C$ (the base category C is a prestack over itself via the identity). Then p is strongly representable if and only if $X \simeq X \times_C C$ is a scheme in C.

The definition applies also to the diagonal morphism $\Delta: X \to X \times X$. If $\Delta$ is strongly representable, then every morphism $U \to X$ from a scheme U is strongly representable since $U \times_X T \simeq (U \times T) \times_{X \times X} X$ is strongly representable for any T → X.

If $f: X \to Y$ is a strongly representable morphism, for any $S \to Y$, S a scheme viewed as a prestack, the projection $X \times_Y S \to S$ is a morphism of schemes; this allows one to transfer many notions of properties on morphisms of schemes to the stack context. Namely, let P be a property on morphisms in the base category C that is stable under base changes and that is local on the topology of C (e.g., étale topology or smooth topology). Then a strongly representable morphism $f: X \to Y$ of prestacks is said to have the property P if, for every morphism $T \to Y$, T a scheme viewed as a prestack, the induced projection $X \times_Y T \to T$ has the property P.

== Example: the prestack given by an action of an algebraic group ==
Let G be an algebraic group acting from the right on a scheme X of finite type over a field k. Then the group action of G on X determines a prestack (but not a stack) over the category C of k-schemes, as follows. Let F be the category where

1. an object is a pair $(U, x)$ consisting of a scheme U in C and x in the set $X(U)=\operatorname{Hom}_C(U, X)$,
2. a morphism $(U, x) \to (V, y)$ consists of an $U \to V$ in C and an element $g \in G(U)$ such that xg = y' where we wrote $y': U \to V \overset{y}\to X$.

Through the forgetful functor to C, this category F is fibered in groupoids and is known as an action groupoid or a transformation groupoid. It may also be called the quotient prestack of X by G and be denoted as $[X/G]^{pre}$, since, as it turns out, the stackification of it is the quotient stack $[X/G]$. The construction is a special case of forming #The prestack of equivalence classes; in particular, F is a prestack.

When X is a point $* = \operatorname{Spec}(k)$ and G is affine, the quotient $[*/G]^{pre}= BG^{pre}$ is the classifying prestack of G and its stackification is the classifying stack of G.

One viewing X as a prestack (in fact a stack), there is the obvious canonical map

$$\pi: X \to F$$

over C; explicitly, each object $(U, x: U \to X)$ in the prestack X goes to itself, and each morphism $(U, x) \to (V, y)$, satisfying x equals $U \to V \overset{y}\to X$ by definition, goes to the identity group element of G(U).

Then the above canonical map fits into a 2-coequalizer (a 2-quotient):

$$X \times G \overset{s}\underset{t}\rightrightarrows X \overset{\pi}\to F$$,

where t: (x, g) → xg is the given group action and s a projection. It is not 1-coequalizer since, instead of the equality $\pi \circ s = \pi \circ t$, one has $\pi \circ s \overset{\sim}\to \pi \circ t$ given by

$$g: (\pi \circ s)(x, g) = \pi(x) \overset{\sim}\to (\pi \circ t)(x, g) = \pi(xg).$$

== The prestack of equivalence classes ==
Let X be a scheme in the base category C. By definition, an equivalence pre-relation is a morphism $R \to X \times X$ in C such that, for each scheme T in C, the function $f(T): R(T) = \operatorname{Hom}(T, R) \to X(T) \times X(T)$ has the image that is an equivalence relation. The prefix "pre-" is because we do not require $f(T)$ to be an injective function.

Example: Let an algebraic group G act on a scheme X of finite type over a field k. Take $R = X \times_k G$ and then for any scheme T over k let

$$f(T): R(T) \to X(T) \times X(T), \, (x, g) \mapsto (x, xg).$$

By Yoneda's lemma, this determines a morphism f, which is clearly an equivalence pre-relation.

To each given equivalence pre-relation $f: R \to X \times X$ (+ some more data), there is an associated prestack F defined as follows. Firstly, F is a category where: with the notations $s = p_1 \circ f, \, t = p_2 \circ f$,

1. an object is a pair $(T, x)$ consisting of a scheme T and a morphism x: T → X in C
2. a morphism $(T, x) \to (S, y)$ consists of a $T \to S$ and $\delta: T \to R$ such that $s \circ \delta = x$ and $t \circ \delta = y|_T: T \to S \overset{y}\to X$
3. the composition of $(, \delta): (T, x) \to (S, y)$ followed by $(, \delta'): (S, y) \to (U, z)$ consists of $T \to S \to U$ and $\delta'': T \to R$ obtained as follows: since $t \circ \delta = y|_T = s \circ \delta'|_T$, by the universal property, there is an induced map
  $$(\delta, \delta'|_T): T \to R \times_{t, s} R$$.
  Then let $\delta''$ be $T \to R \times_{t, s} R$ followed by the multiplication
4. the identity morphism for an object $(T, x)$ consists of the identity map T → T and δ that is $x : T \to X$ followed by $e: X \to R$; the latter is obtained by factorizing the diagonal morphism through f, possible by reflexivity.

Via a forgetful functor, the category F is fibered in groupoids. Finally, we check F is a prestack; for that, notice: for objects x, y in F(U) and an object $f: V \to U$ in $C_{/U}$,

$$\begin{align}
\underline{\operatorname{Hom}}(x, y)(V \overset{f}\to U) &= [\operatorname{Hom}(f^* x, f^*y)] \\
&= [\{ \delta: V \to R | s \circ \delta = f^* x, t \circ \delta = f^* y\}] \\
&= [\{ \delta: V \to R | (s, t) \circ \delta = (x, y) \circ f \}].
\end{align}$$

Now, this means that $\underline{\operatorname{Hom}}(x, y)$ is the fiber product of $(s, t): R \to X \times X$ and $(x, y): U \to X \times X$. Since the fiber product of sheaves is a sheaf, it follows that $\underline{\operatorname{Hom}}(x, y)$ is a sheaf.

The prestack F above may be written as $[X/\sim_{R}]^{pre}$ and the stackification of it is written as $[X/\sim_{R}]$.

Note, when X is viewed as a stack, both X and $[X/\sim_{R}]^{pre}$ have the same set of objects. On the morphism-level, while X has only identity morphisms as morphisms, the prestack $[X/\sim_{R}]^{pre}$ have additional morphisms $\delta$ specified by the equivalence pre-relation f.

One importance of this construction is that it provides an atlas for an algebraic space: every algebraic space is of the form $[U/\sim_{R}]$ for some schemes U, R and an étale equivalence pre-relation $f: R \to U \times U$ such that, for each T, $f(T): R(T) \to U(T) \times U(T)$ is an injective function ("étale" means the two possible maps $s, t: R \to U \times U \to U$ are étale.)

Starting from a Deligne–Mumford stack $\mathfrak{X}$, one can find an equivalence pre-relation $f: R \to U \times U$ for some schemes R, U so that $\mathfrak{X}$ is the stackification of the prestack associated to it: $\mathfrak{X} \simeq [U/\sim_{R}]$. This is done as follows. By definition, there is an étale surjective morphism $\pi: U \to \mathfrak{X}$ from some scheme U. Since the diagonal is strongly representable, the fiber product $U \times_{\mathfrak{X}} U = R$ is a scheme (that is, represented by a scheme) and then let

$$s, t: R \rightrightarrows U$$

be the first and second projections. Taking $f = (s, t): R \to U \times U$, we see $f$ is an equivalence pre-relation. We finish, roughly, as follows.

1. Extend $\pi: U \to \mathfrak{X}$ to $\pi: [U/\sim_{R}]^{pre} \to \mathfrak{X}$ (nothing changes on the object-level; we only need to explain how to send $\delta$.)
2. By the universal property of stackification, $\pi$ factors through $[U/\sim_{R}] \to \mathfrak{X}$.
3. Check the last map is an isomorphism.

== Stacks associated to prestacks ==
There is a way to associate a stack to a given prestack. It is similar to the sheafification of a presheaf and is called stackification. The idea of the construction is quite simple: given a prestack $p: F \to C$, we let HF be the category where an object is a descent datum and a morphism is that of descent data. (The details are omitted for now)

As it turns out, it is a stack and comes with a natural morphism $\theta: F \to HF$ such that F is a stack if and only if θ is an isomorphism.

In some special cases, the stackification can be described in terms of torsors for affine group schemes or the generalizations. In fact, according to this point of view, a stack in groupoids is nothing but a category of torsors, and a prestack a category of trivial torsors, which are local models of torsors.
