= Deligne–Mumford stack =

Type of object in algebraic geometry

In algebraic geometry, a Deligne–Mumford stack is a stack that behaves, in many respects, like an algebraic variety or an orbifold, while still allowing mild stacky phenomena such as finite stabilizer groups. More precisely, a stack $F$ over schemes is Deligne–Mumford if its diagonal is sufficiently well behaved and if it admits an étale surjective cover by a scheme (an atlas).

Pierre Deligne and David Mumford introduced this notion in their 1969 paper on the irreducibility of the moduli space of algebraic curves, where they showed that the moduli stack of stable curves of fixed arithmetic genus is a proper smooth Deligne–Mumford stack over $\operatorname{Spec}\mathbb{Z}$. Since then, Deligne–Mumford stacks have become a basic tool in moduli theory and in modern intersection theory, for instance in Gromov–Witten theory.

== Definition ==
Let $S$ be a base scheme, and let F be a stack on $(\operatorname{Sch}/S)_{\text{ét}}$. The stack F is called a Deligne–Mumford stack if the following conditions hold:

1. The diagonal morphism
  $$\Delta_F\colon F \to F \times_S F$$
  is representable, quasi-compact and separated.
2. There exists a scheme U and a representable, surjective, étale morphism
  $$U \to F,$$
  called an atlas (or cover) of F.

Many authors formulate the definition in the context of algebraic stacks by additionally requiring that F be an algebraic stack (in the sense of Michael Artin). In such formulations, a Deligne–Mumford stack is an algebraic stack whose diagonal is unramified and which admits an étale surjective atlas by a scheme.

== Relation with other notions ==
=== Algebraic stacks and Artin stacks ===
If, in the definition above, the word “étale” is weakened to “smooth”, one obtains the notion of an algebraic stack (often called an Artin stack after Michael Artin). Thus every Deligne–Mumford stack is an algebraic (Artin) stack, but not conversely.

The condition that the atlas is étale forces stabilizer groups to be finite and unramified over the base. In contrast, general Artin stacks may have positive-dimensional stabilizers, such as copies of $\mathbb{G}_m$ or abelian varieties.

=== Algebraic spaces ===
An algebraic space can be regarded as a special case of a Deligne–Mumford stack, namely a Deligne–Mumford stack whose diagonal is an immersion and whose stabilizer groups are trivial. In this sense, algebraic spaces are “non-stacky” Deligne–Mumford stacks.

=== Orbifolds ===
Over the complex numbers, separated Deligne–Mumford stacks of finite type with finite stabilizers are often viewed as algebro-geometric analogues of orbifolds. More precisely, a smooth Deligne–Mumford stack over $\mathbb{C}$ with finite stabilizers determines, and is determined by, a complex orbifold together with additional algebro-geometric structure.

== Properties ==
Let F be a Deligne–Mumford stack that is quasi-compact and quasi-separated.

- Finite stabilizers and automorphisms. For any quasi-compact scheme B and any object $X \in F(B)$, the automorphism group of X over B is finite. Equivalently, the inertia stack of F is finite over F.
- Coarse moduli spaces. If the inertia stack of F is finite (for example, if F is a separated Deligne–Mumford stack locally of finite type over a Noetherian base), then F admits a coarse moduli space in the sense of Deligne–Mumford, which is an algebraic space representing isomorphism classes of objects up to finite stabilizers.
- Presentation by groupoids. Every Deligne–Mumford stack F admits a presentation by a groupoid in schemes. Concretely, if U → F is an étale surjective atlas, then the fiber product $R = U \times_F U$ defines a groupoid scheme $R \rightrightarrows U$ whose associated quotient stack is equivalent to F. See groupoid scheme for details.
- Local quotient structure. Étale-locally on the base, a Deligne–Mumford stack is a quotient of a scheme by a finite group action: for every point of F there is an étale neighborhood over which F is equivalent to a quotient stack $[X/G]$ with G finite (often referred to as an orbifold chart).

== Examples ==
=== Quotient by a finite group (affine stacks) ===
A basic way to construct Deligne–Mumford stacks is to take the stack quotient of a scheme or algebraic space by a finite group action with finite stabilizers. Let $C_n = \langle a \mid a^n = 1 \rangle$ be a cyclic group of order n acting on $\mathbb{C}^2$ by
$$a\cdot(x,y) = (\zeta_n x,\;\zeta_n y),$$
where $\zeta_n$ is a primitive nth root of unity. The quotient stack $[\mathbb{C}^2 / C_n]$ is then an affine smooth Deligne–Mumford stack: the stabilizer is trivial away from the origin, and equal to the full group at the origin, so all stabilizers are finite.

More generally, if a finite group G acts on a scheme X over a base scheme S in such a way that the action is étale and the stabilizers are finite over S, then the quotient stack $[X/G]$ is a Deligne–Mumford stack over S.

=== Weighted projective stacks ===
Non-affine examples arise from weighted projective spaces and weighted projective varieties. For instance, the weighted projective line $\mathbb{P}(2,3)$ can be described as the quotient stack $[\mathbb{C}^2 \setminus \{0\} / \mathbb{C}^*]$ where $\mathbb{C}^*$ acts by
$$\lambda \cdot (x,y) = (\lambda^2 x,\;\lambda^3 y).$$
A point $(x,y)$ has a non-trivial stabilizer precisely when either $x = 0$ or $y = 0$, in which case the stabilizer is a finite group of roots of unity (of order 2 or 3 respectively). Hence all stabilizers are finite and the quotient stack is Deligne–Mumford. Such stacks are sometimes referred to as weighted projective stacks or stacky projective lines.

=== Moduli stacks of curves ===
The prototypical examples of Deligne–Mumford stacks arise in the moduli theory of curves. For an integer $g \geq 2$, the moduli stack $\mathcal{M}_g$ of smooth, proper, connected curves of genus g over schemes is an algebraic stack; its Deligne–Mumford compactification $\overline{\mathcal{M}}_g$, obtained by allowing stable nodal curves, is a proper smooth Deligne–Mumford stack over $\operatorname{Spec}\mathbb{Z}$.

More generally, the moduli stacks $\mathcal{M}_{g,n}$ and $\overline{\mathcal{M}}_{g,n}$ of curves of genus g with n marked points are Deligne–Mumford stacks, and their geometry plays a central role in modern enumerative geometry and intersection theory.

=== Stacky curves ===
A stacky curve is, roughly speaking, a connected, one-dimensional, separated Deligne–Mumford stack of finite type over an algebraically closed field, with generically trivial stabilizer. Such objects generalize smooth projective curves by allowing finitely many stacky points with non-trivial finite stabilizer groups. Weighted projective lines and certain orbifold curves arising in representation theory and arithmetic geometry provide basic examples.

== Non-example ==
A simple example of an algebraic stack that is not Deligne–Mumford is the classifying stack of the multiplicative group: $[B\mathbb{G}_m] = [\operatorname{Spec} k / \mathbb{G}_m].$ Here the stabilizer group at every point is isomorphic to $\mathbb{G}_m$, which is infinite and has positive dimension. Thus the diagonal is not unramified and the stack fails to be Deligne–Mumford, although it is an Artin stack.

== See also ==
- Algebraic stack
- Algebraic space
- Artin stack
- Orbifold
- Moduli space of algebraic curves
- Quotient stack
- Stacky curve
