= Sumihiro's theorem =

In algebraic geometry, Sumihiro's theorem, introduced by (Sumihiro 1974), states that a normal algebraic variety with an action of a torus can be covered by torus-invariant affine open subsets.

The "normality" in the hypothesis cannot be relaxed. The hypothesis that the group acting on the variety is a torus can also not be relaxed.
