= Morphism of algebraic stacks =

Type of functor

In algebraic geometry, given algebraic stacks $p: X \to C, \, q: Y \to C$ over a base category C, a morphism $f: X \to Y$ of algebraic stacks is a functor such that $q \circ f = p$.

More generally, one can also consider a morphism between prestacks (a stackification would be an example).

== Types ==
One particular important example is a presentation of a stack, which is widely used in the study of stacks.

An algebraic stack X is said to be smooth of dimension n - j if there is a smooth presentation $U \to X$ of relative dimension j for some smooth scheme U of dimension n. For example, if $\operatorname{Vect}_n$ denotes the moduli stack of rank-n vector bundles, then there is a presentation $\operatorname{Spec}(k) \to \operatorname{Vect}_n$ given by the trivial bundle $\mathbb{A}^n_k$ over $\operatorname{Spec}(k)$.

A quasi-affine morphism between algebraic stacks is a morphism that factorizes as a quasi-compact open immersion followed by an affine morphism.
