= Moduli stack of formal group laws =

In algebraic geometry, the moduli stack of formal group laws is a stack classifying formal group laws and isomorphisms between them. It is denoted by $\mathcal{M}_{\text{FG}}$. It is a "geometric object" that underlies the chromatic approach to the stable homotopy theory, a branch of algebraic topology.

Currently, it is not known whether $\mathcal{M}_{\text{FG}}$ is a derived stack or not. Hence, it is typical to work with stratifications. Let $\mathcal{M}^n_{\text{FG}}$ be given so that $\mathcal{M}^n_{\text{FG}}(R)$ consists of formal group laws over R of height exactly n. They form a stratification of the moduli stack $\mathcal{M}_{\text{FG}}$. $\operatorname{Spec} \overline{\mathbb{F}_p} \to \mathcal{M}^n_{\text{FG}}$ is faithfully flat. In fact, $\mathcal{M}^n_{\text{FG}}$ is of the form $\operatorname{Spec} \overline{\mathbb{F}_p} / \operatorname{Aut}(\overline{\mathbb{F}_p}, f)$ where $\operatorname{Aut}(\overline{\mathbb{F}_p}, f)$ is a profinite group called the Morava stabilizer group. The Lubin–Tate theory describes how the strata $\mathcal{M}^n_{\text{FG}}$ fit together.
