= Arithmetic and geometric Frobenius =

In mathematics, the Frobenius endomorphism is defined in any commutative ring $R$ that has characteristic $p$, where $p$ is a prime number. Namely, the mapping $\phi:r\mapsto r^p$ is a ring endomorphism of $R$.

The image of $\phi$ is then $R^p$, the subring of $R$ consisting of $p$-th powers. In some important cases, for example finite fields, $\phi$ is surjective. Otherwise, $\phi$ is an endomorphism but not a ring automorphism.

The terminology of geometric Frobenius arises by applying the spectrum of a ring construction to $\phi$. This gives a mapping

$$\phi^*:\operatorname{Spec}(R^p)\to\operatorname{Spec}(R)$$

of affine schemes. Even in cases where $R^p=R$ this is not the identity, unless $R$ is the prime field.

Mappings created by fibre product with $\phi^*$, i.e. base changes, tend in scheme theory to be called geometric Frobenius. The reason for a careful terminology is that the Frobenius automorphism in Galois groups, or defined by transport of structure, is often the inverse mapping of the geometric Frobenius. As in the case of a cyclic group in which a generator is also the inverse of a generator, there are in many situations two possible definitions of Frobenius, and without a consistent convention some problem of a minus sign may appear.
