= Cohomology of a stack =

In algebraic geometry, the cohomology of a stack is a collection of cohomological theories associated with algebraic stacks, extending familiar constructions from the cohomology of schemes and algebraic varieties.

Important examples include étale cohomology, lisse–étale cohomology, de Rham cohomology, and cohomology theories associated with quotient stacks.

For a quotient stack of the form $[X/G]$, cohomology is closely related to equivariant cohomology. In particular, the cohomology of the classifying stack $BG=[\operatorname{Spec}(k)/G]$ provides an algebro-geometric counterpart of the cohomology of a classifying space.

The relationship between the cohomology and the Chow groups of a stack is studied using cycle-class homomorphisms. Such maps connect algebraic cycles with cohomology classes, although their existence and properties depend on the cohomology theory and the class of stacks under consideration.

== Algebraic stacks and their cohomology ==
=== Algebraic stacks ===
Let $S$ be a base scheme and let $\mathcal{X}$ be an algebraic stack over $S$.

An algebraic stack is a stack in groupoids on a suitable site over $S$, usually the fppf site, whose diagonal is representable by algebraic spaces and which admits a smooth surjective atlas from a scheme.

Thus there exists a scheme $U$ and a smooth surjective morphism

$$p:U\longrightarrow\mathcal{X}.$$

The fiber product

$$R=U\times_{\mathcal{X}}U$$

is an algebraic space, and the two projections

$$s,t:R\rightrightarrows U$$

define a groupoid object in algebraic spaces.

The stack $\mathcal{X}$ is recovered from this groupoid by stackification, and is commonly denoted by

$$\mathcal{X}\simeq[U/R].$$

The groupoid presentation provides a method for studying cohomological invariants through descent.

=== The lisse–étale site ===
Let $\mathcal{X}$ be an algebraic stack.

The lisse–étale site of $\mathcal{X}$, denoted by

$$\mathcal{X}_{\mathrm{lis\text{-}\acute{e}t}},$$

has objects consisting of pairs $(U,u)$, where $U$ is a scheme and

$$u:U\longrightarrow\mathcal{X}$$

is a smooth morphism.

Morphisms are compatible morphisms over $\mathcal{X}$, and coverings are given by families of étale morphisms whose images cover the source.

The associated category of sheaves of abelian groups is an abelian category with enough injective objects.

For an abelian sheaf $\mathcal{F}$ on this site, its cohomology groups are defined by

$$H^n_{\mathrm{lis\text{-}\acute{e}t}}
(\mathcal{X},\mathcal{F})
=
R^n\Gamma(\mathcal{X},\mathcal{F}),$$

where $R^n\Gamma$ denotes the $n$-th right-derived functor of the global-sections functor.

Equivalently, if

$$0\longrightarrow\mathcal{F}
\longrightarrow I^0
\longrightarrow I^1
\longrightarrow\cdots$$

is an injective resolution, then

$$H^n(\mathcal{X},\mathcal{F})
=
H^n\left(
\Gamma(\mathcal{X},I^\bullet)
\right).$$

This definition extends the derived-functor formulation of sheaf cohomology from schemes to algebraic stacks.

=== Degree-zero cohomology ===
By the definition of right-derived functors,

$$H^0(\mathcal{X},\mathcal{F})
=
\Gamma(\mathcal{X},\mathcal{F}).$$

In particular, degree-zero cohomology records global sections of the sheaf.

For a constant sheaf with values in an abelian group $A$, degree-zero cohomology consists of locally constant $A$-valued sections.

When the underlying étale topos is connected, this gives

$$H^0(\mathcal{X},A)\cong A.$$

== Cohomological descent ==
=== Simplicial presentation ===
Let

$$p:U\longrightarrow\mathcal{X}$$

be a smooth surjective atlas.

Its Čech nerve is the simplicial algebraic space $U_\bullet$, with

$$U_n=
\underbrace{
U\times_{\mathcal{X}}\cdots
\times_{\mathcal{X}}U
}_{n+1\text{ factors}}.$$

The face maps are obtained by omitting factors, while the degeneracy maps are induced by diagonal morphisms.

The simplicial identities imply that the alternating sum of the pullback maps defines a differential.

For an appropriate sheaf complex, the resulting cohomological descent spectral sequence takes the form

$$E_1^{p,q}
=
H^q(U_p,\mathcal{F}_p)
\Longrightarrow
H^{p+q}(\mathcal{X},\mathcal{F}),$$

where the cohomology on the left is taken in the appropriate site and $\mathcal{F}_p$ is the pullback of the coefficient sheaf.

The first differential is

$$d_1=
\sum_{i=0}^{p+1}(-1)^i d_i^*.$$

Here the maps $d_i$ are the face maps of the simplicial presentation.

The convergence and identification with stack cohomology follow from the relevant cohomological descent theorem.

=== Differential identity ===
The differential satisfies

$$d_1^2=0.$$

To see this, expand the composition as an alternating sum of compositions of face maps.

The simplicial identities give

$$d_i d_j=d_{j-1}d_i
\qquad(i<j).$$

Consequently, every composite appearing in the expansion occurs twice with opposite signs.

The terms cancel in pairs, yielding

$$d_1\circ d_1=0.$$

This is the simplicial origin of the cochain-complex structure used in cohomological descent.

== Quotient stacks ==
=== Definition ===
Let $G$ be a group scheme acting on a scheme $X$ over a field $k$.

The associated quotient stack is denoted by

$$[X/G].$$

For a test scheme $T$, its objects consist of principal $G$-bundles

$$P\longrightarrow T$$

together with $G$-equivariant morphisms

$$P\longrightarrow X.$$

Morphisms are isomorphisms of principal bundles compatible with the equivariant maps.

This construction retains information about stabilizer groups that may be lost when passing to a coarse quotient.

=== Free actions ===
Suppose that $G$ acts freely on $X$ and that the quotient

$$Y=X/G$$

exists as a scheme, with $X\longrightarrow Y$ a principal $G$-bundle.

Then

$$[X/G]\simeq Y.$$

To establish this equivalence, consider an object $(P,f)$ of $[X/G](T)$.

The equivariant morphism $f:P\to X$ induces a morphism

$$T=P/G\longrightarrow X/G=Y.$$

Conversely, a morphism $T\to Y$ determines the pullback principal bundle

$$P=T\times_Y X.$$

Its projection to $X$ is equivariant.

These constructions are inverse up to natural isomorphism, establishing the equivalence of stacks.

Therefore, for any cohomology theory invariant under equivalence of stacks,

$$H^n([X/G],\mathcal{F})
\cong
H^n(Y,\mathcal{F}_Y),$$

where the coefficient sheaves correspond under the equivalence.

== Classifying stacks ==
=== Definition ===
The classifying stack of a group scheme $G$ over $k$ is

$$BG=
[\operatorname{Spec}(k)/G].$$

For every $k$-scheme $T$, the groupoid $BG(T)$ is the groupoid of principal $G$-bundles over $T$.

The canonical morphism

$$\operatorname{Spec}(k)\longrightarrow BG$$

corresponds to the trivial principal bundle.

When $G$ is smooth, this morphism is a smooth surjective atlas.

Its Čech nerve is given by

$$U_n\cong G^n.$$

Thus the simplicial presentation of $BG$ has the form

This is the algebraic analogue of the simplicial bar construction used in the topology of classifying spaces.

=== Finite constant groups ===
Let $k$ be an algebraically closed field, let $G$ be a finite constant group, and let $A$ be a finite abelian group whose order is invertible in $k$.

For the constant étale coefficient sheaf $A$, one obtains

$$H^n_{\acute{e}t}(BG,A)
\cong
H^n(G,A),$$

where the right-hand side denotes ordinary group cohomology with trivial $G$-action.

More generally, locally constant coefficient systems on $BG$ correspond to suitable $G$-modules.

=== Derivation ===
The atlas

$$\operatorname{Spec}(k)\to BG$$

has Čech nerve $G^\bullet$.

Since $G$ is a finite constant group,

$$G^n=
\coprod_{G^n}\operatorname{Spec}(k).$$

For the specified coefficients, the higher étale cohomology of each term vanishes:

$$H^q_{\acute{e}t}(G^n,A)=0
\qquad(q>0).$$

The descent spectral sequence therefore has only its degree-zero row.

That row consists of the cochain groups

$$C^n(G,A)=
\operatorname{Map}(G^n,A).$$

The alternating face-map differential is precisely the standard differential defining group cohomology.

It follows that

$$H^n_{\acute{e}t}(BG,A)
\cong H^n(G,A).$$

== Equivariant cohomology ==
In algebraic topology, the Borel equivariant cohomology of a space $X$ with an action of a topological group $G$ is defined by

$$H_G^*(X;R)
=
H^*(EG\times_G X;R),$$

where $EG$ is a contractible space carrying a free $G$-action.

The quotient

$$EG\times_G X$$

is called the homotopy quotient.

In algebraic geometry, the quotient stack $[X/G]$ serves as an analogue of this homotopy quotient.

For suitable complex algebraic groups and varieties, the cohomology of the associated analytic quotient stack agrees with the corresponding topological equivariant cohomology.

Thus, in these settings,

$$H^*([X/G]^{an};R)
\cong
H_G^*(X^{an};R).$$

The precise comparison depends on the chosen topology and coefficient theory.

== Borel's theorem ==
=== Polynomial cohomology of classifying spaces ===
Let $G$ be a compact connected Lie group of rank $r$.

A theorem of Borel identifies its rational classifying-space cohomology as a polynomial algebra on $r$ generators of positive even degrees:

$$H^*(BG;\mathbb{Q})
\cong
\mathbb{Q}[x_1,\ldots,x_r].$$

The degrees of the generators depend on the group.

This statement concerns the topological classifying space of $G$ and rational coefficients.

It does not imply that the cohomology of every algebraic classifying stack is a polynomial ring.

=== The maximal torus ===
Let $T$ be a maximal torus of $G$ and let

$$W=N_G(T)/T$$

be its Weyl group.

Borel's theorem gives an isomorphism

$$H^*(BG;\mathbb{Q})
\cong
H^*(BT;\mathbb{Q})^W.$$

Since $T$ is a torus of rank $r$,

$$H^*(BT;\mathbb{Q})
\cong
\mathbb{Q}[t_1,\ldots,t_r],
\qquad
\deg(t_i)=2.$$

The Weyl group acts on this polynomial algebra through its action on the character lattice of the torus.

The Weyl group is a finite reflection group, so its invariant polynomial algebra over $\mathbb{Q}$ is itself a polynomial algebra.

This gives the polynomial-ring description of $H^*(BG;\mathbb{Q})$.

=== Example: the general linear group ===
For the complex general linear group $\operatorname{GL}_n(\mathbb{C})$, the corresponding topological classifying space has integral cohomology ring

$$H^*(B\operatorname{GL}_n(\mathbb{C});\mathbb{Z})
\cong
\mathbb{Z}[c_1,\ldots,c_n],$$

where $c_i$ is the universal $i$-th Chern class and

$$\deg(c_i)=2i.$$

The maximal compact subgroup is the unitary group $U(n)$, which has the same homotopy type of classifying space.

The polynomial generators are the universal Chern classes of the tautological rank-$n$ complex vector bundle.

== Chow groups and cycle classes ==
The Chow groups of algebraic stacks provide an intersection-theoretic counterpart to their cohomology.

For suitable quotient stacks, equivariant Chow groups are defined by approximating the quotient stack with quotients of schemes on which the group acts freely.

The equivariant Chow group of $X$ is denoted by

$$A_G^i(X).$$

Under the appropriate hypotheses, this is identified with the codimension-$i$ Chow group of $[X/G]$.

For smooth complex quotient stacks, cycle-class maps relate equivariant Chow groups to even-degree equivariant cohomology:

$$\operatorname{cl}:
A_G^i(X)
\longrightarrow
H_G^{2i}(X;\mathbb{Z}).$$

These maps are compatible with standard operations under the relevant hypotheses.

They need not be injective or surjective in general.

Consequently, Chow groups and cohomology should be regarded as related but distinct invariants rather than as universally equivalent theories.

=== Example: the multiplicative group ===
Let

$$G=\mathbb{G}_m.$$

The classifying stack

$$B\mathbb{G}_m$$

classifies line bundles.

Its integral Chow ring is

$$A^*(B\mathbb{G}_m)
\cong
\mathbb{Z}[c_1],$$

where $c_1$ is the first Chern class of the universal line bundle.

Over the complex numbers, the corresponding topological cohomology ring is

$$H^*(B\mathbb{C}^{\times};\mathbb{Z})
\cong
\mathbb{Z}[c_1],
\qquad
\deg(c_1)=2.$$

The agreement illustrates the relationship between intersection theory on classifying stacks and topological equivariant cohomology.

== Spectral sequences ==
Spectral sequences provide a method for computing the cohomology of stacks from presentations, fibrations, and group actions.

For a smooth atlas with Čech nerve $U_\bullet$, cohomological descent gives

$$E_1^{p,q}
=
H^q(U_p,\mathcal{F}_p)
\Longrightarrow
H^{p+q}(\mathcal{X},\mathcal{F}).$$

The differential on the first page is induced by the simplicial face maps.

For a topological group acting on a space $X$, the Borel fibration

$$X\longrightarrow
EG\times_G X
\longrightarrow BG$$

gives a Serre spectral sequence

$$E_2^{p,q}
=
H^p(BG;\mathcal{H}^q(X;R))
\Longrightarrow
H_G^{p+q}(X;R).$$

The coefficient system $\mathcal{H}^q(X;R)$ incorporates the monodromy action on the cohomology of the fiber.

If this action is trivial, the second page simplifies to

$$E_2^{p,q}
=
H^p(BG;R)\otimes_R H^q(X;R)$$

when the required flatness or field-coefficient hypotheses hold.

This spectral sequence connects the cohomology of the classifying space with the cohomology of the original space.

== Applications ==
Cohomology theories of algebraic stacks are used in the study of moduli problems, intersection theory, characteristic classes, and arithmetic geometry.

Stacks arise naturally as moduli spaces because geometric objects frequently possess nontrivial automorphisms.

Their cohomology retains information about these automorphisms and allows cohomological constructions to be applied to moduli problems that cannot be represented adequately by schemes alone.

Important examples include moduli stacks of curves, stacks of principal bundles, quotient stacks, and classifying stacks of algebraic groups.

== See also ==
- Algebraic stack
- Étale cohomology
- Equivariant cohomology
- Classifying space
- Chow group
- Derived functor
- Cohomological descent
- Spectral sequence
- Chern class
- Shimura variety
