= Quotient stack =

In algebraic geometry, a quotient stack is a stack that parametrizes equivariant objects. Geometrically, it generalizes a quotient of a scheme or a variety by a group: a quotient variety, say, would be a coarse approximation of a quotient stack.

The notion is of fundamental importance in the study of stacks: a stack that arises in nature is often either a quotient stack itself or admits a stratification by quotient stacks (e.g., a Deligne–Mumford stack). A quotient stack is also used to construct other stacks like classifying stacks.

== Definition ==
A quotient stack is defined as follows. Let G be an affine smooth group scheme over a scheme S and X an S-scheme on which G acts. Let the quotient stack $[X/G]$ be the category over the category of S-schemes, where

- an object over T is a principal G-bundle $P\to T$ together with equivariant map $P\to X$;
- a morphism from $P\to T$ to $P'\to T'$ is a bundle map (i.e., forms a commutative diagram) that is compatible with the equivariant maps $P\to X$ and $P'\to X$.

Suppose the quotient $X/G$ exists as an algebraic space (for example, by the Keel–Mori theorem). The canonical map

$$[X/G] \to X/G$$,

that sends a bundle P over T to a corresponding T-point, need not be an isomorphism of stacks; that is, the space "X/G" is usually coarser. The canonical map is an isomorphism if and only if the stabilizers are trivial (in which case $X/G$ exists).

In general, $[X/G]$ is an Artin stack (also called algebraic stack). If the stabilizers of the geometric points are finite and reduced, then it is a Deligne–Mumford stack.

Burt Totaro (2004) has shown: let X be a normal Noetherian algebraic stack whose stabilizer groups at closed points are affine. Then X is a quotient stack if and only if it has the resolution property; i.e., every coherent sheaf is a quotient of a vector bundle. Earlier, Robert Wayne Thomason proved that a quotient stack has the resolution property.

Remark: It is possible to approach the construction from the point of view of simplicial sheaves. See also: simplicial diagram.

== Examples ==
An effective quotient orbifold, e.g., $[M/G]$ where the $G$ action has only finite stabilizers on the smooth space $M$, is an example of a quotient stack.

If $X = S$ with trivial action of $G$ (often $S$ is a point), then $[S/G]$ is called the classifying stack of $G$ (in analogy with the classifying space of $G$) and is usually denoted by $BG$. Borel's theorem describes the cohomology ring of the classifying stack.

=== Moduli of line bundles ===
One of the basic examples of quotient stacks comes from the moduli stack $B\mathbb{G}_m$ of line bundles $[*/\mathbb{G}_m]$ over $\text{Sch}$, or $[S/\mathbb{G}_m]$ over $\text{Sch}/S$ for the trivial $\mathbb{G}_m$-action on $S$. For any scheme (or $S$-scheme) $X$, the $X$-points of the moduli stack are the groupoid of principal $\mathbb{G}_m$-bundles $P \to X$.

=== Moduli of line bundles with n-sections ===
There is another closely related moduli stack given by $[\mathbb{A}^n/\mathbb{G}_m]$ which is the moduli stack of line bundles with $n$-sections. This follows directly from the definition of quotient stacks evaluated on points. For a scheme $X$, the $X$-points are the groupoid whose objects are given by the set

$$[\mathbb{A}^n/\mathbb{G}_m](X) = \left\{
\begin{matrix}
P & \to & \mathbb{A}^n \\
\downarrow & & \\
X
\end{matrix} : \begin{align}
&P \to \mathbb{A}^n \text{ is }\mathbb{G}_m\text{ equivariant and} \\
&P \to X \text{ is a principal } \mathbb{G}_m\text{-bundle}
\end{align}
\right\}$$

The morphism in the top row corresponds to the $n$-sections of the associated line bundle over $X$. This can be found by noting giving a $\mathbb{G}_m$-equivariant map $\phi: P \to \mathbb{A}^1$ and restricting it to the fiber $P|_x$ gives the same data as a section $\sigma$ of the bundle. This can be checked by looking at a chart and sending a point $x \in X$ to the map $\phi_x$, noting the set of $\mathbb{G}_m$-equivariant maps $P|_x \to \mathbb{A}^1$ is isomorphic to $\mathbb{G}_m$. This construction then globalizes by gluing affine charts together, giving a global section of the bundle. Since $\mathbb{G}_m$-equivariant maps to $\mathbb{A}^n$ is equivalently an $n$-tuple of $\mathbb{G}_m$-equivariant maps to $\mathbb{A}^1$, the result holds.

=== Moduli of formal group laws ===
Example: Let L be the Lazard ring; i.e., $L = \pi_* \operatorname{MU}$. Then the quotient stack $[\operatorname{Spec}L/G]$ by $G$,

$$G(R) = \{g \in R[\![t]\!] | g(t) = b_0 t + b_1t^2+ \cdots, b_0 \in R^\times \}$$,

is called the moduli stack of formal group laws, denoted by $\mathcal{M}_\text{FG}$.

== See also ==
- Homotopy quotient
- Moduli stack of principal bundles (which, roughly, is an infinite product of classifying stacks.)
- Group-scheme action
- Moduli of algebraic curves
