= Algebraic space =

Generalization of a scheme

In mathematics, algebraic spaces form a generalization of the schemes of algebraic geometry, introduced by Michael Artin for use in deformation theory. Intuitively, schemes are given by gluing together affine schemes using the Zariski topology, while algebraic spaces are given by gluing together affine schemes using the finer étale topology. Alternatively one can think of schemes as being locally isomorphic to affine schemes in the Zariski topology, while algebraic spaces are locally isomorphic to affine schemes in the étale topology.

The resulting category of algebraic spaces extends the category of schemes and allows one to carry out several natural constructions that are used in the construction of moduli spaces but are not always possible in the smaller category of schemes, such as taking the quotient of a free action by a finite group (cf. the Keel–Mori theorem).

== Definition ==
There are two common ways to define algebraic spaces: they can be defined as either quotients of schemes by étale equivalence relations, or as sheaves on a big étale site that are locally isomorphic to schemes. These two definitions are essentially equivalent.

=== Algebraic spaces as quotients of schemes ===
An algebraic space X comprises a scheme U and a closed subscheme R ⊆ U × U satisfying the following two conditions:

1. R is an equivalence relation as a subset of U × U
2. The projections p_{i}: R → U onto each factor are étale maps.

Some authors, such as Knutson, add an extra condition that an algebraic space has to be quasi-separated, meaning that the diagonal map is quasi-compact.

One can always assume that R and U are affine schemes. Doing so means that the theory of algebraic spaces is not dependent on the full theory of schemes, and can indeed be used as a (more general) replacement of that theory.

If R is the trivial equivalence relation over each connected component of U (i.e. for all x, y belonging to the same connected component of U, we have xRy if and only if x=y), then the algebraic space will be a scheme in the usual sense. Since a general algebraic space X does not satisfy this requirement, it allows a single connected component of U to cover X with many "sheets". The point set underlying the algebraic space X is then given by |U| / |R| as a set of equivalence classes.

Let Y be an algebraic space defined by an equivalence relation S ⊂ V × V. The set Hom(Y, X) of morphisms of algebraic spaces is then defined by the condition that it makes the descent sequence

$$\mathrm{Hom}(Y, X) \rightarrow \mathrm{Hom}(V, X) {{{} \atop \longrightarrow}\atop{\longrightarrow \atop {}}} \mathrm{Hom}(S, X)$$

exact (this definition is motivated by a descent theorem of Grothendieck for surjective étale maps of affine schemes). With these definitions, the algebraic spaces form a category.

Let U be an affine scheme over a field k defined by a system of polynomials g(x), x = (x_{1}, ..., x_{n}), let

$$k\{x_1, \ldots, x_n\}\$$

denote the ring of algebraic functions in x over k, and let X = {R ⊂ U × U} be an algebraic space.

The appropriate stalks Õ_{X}_{, x} on X are then defined to be the local rings of algebraic functions defined by Õ_{U}_{, u}, where u ∈ U is a point lying over x and Õ_{U}_{, u} is the local ring corresponding to u of the ring

k{x_{1}, ..., x_{n}} / (g)

of algebraic functions on U.

A point on an algebraic space is said to be smooth if Õ_{X}_{, x} ≅ k{z_{1}, ..., z_{d}} for some indeterminates z_{1}, ..., z_{d}. The dimension of X at x is then just defined to be d.

A morphism f: Y → X of algebraic spaces is said to be étale at y ∈ Y (where x = f(y)) if the induced map on stalks

Õ_{X}_{, x} → Õ_{Y}_{, y}

is an isomorphism.

The structure sheaf O_{X} on the algebraic space X is defined by associating the ring of functions O(V) on V (defined by étale maps from V to the affine line A^{1} in the sense just defined) to any algebraic space V which is étale over X.

=== Algebraic spaces as sheaves ===
An algebraic space $\mathfrak{X}$ can be defined as a sheaf of sets

$$\mathfrak{X} : (\text{Sch}/S)^{op}_{\text{et}} \to \text{Sets}$$

such that

1. There is a surjective étale morphism $h_X \to \mathfrak{X}$
2. the diagonal morphism $\Delta_{\mathfrak{X}/S}: \mathfrak{X} \to \mathfrak{X}\times \mathfrak{X}$ is representable.

The second condition is equivalent to the property that given any schemes $Y,Z$ and morphisms $h_Y,h_Z\to \mathfrak{X}$, their fiber-product of sheaves

$$h_Y\times_\mathfrak{X} h_Z$$

is representable by a scheme over $S$. Note that some authors, such as Knutson, add an extra condition that an algebraic space has to be quasi-separated, meaning that the diagonal map is quasi-compact.

== Algebraic spaces and schemes ==
Algebraic spaces are similar to schemes, and much of the theory of schemes extends to algebraic spaces. For example, most properties of morphisms of schemes also apply to algebraic spaces, one can define cohomology of quasicoherent sheaves, this has the usual finiteness properties for proper morphisms, and so on.

- Proper algebraic spaces over a field of dimension one (curves) are schemes.
- Non-singular proper algebraic spaces of dimension two over a field (smooth surfaces) are schemes.
- Quasi-separated group objects in the category of algebraic spaces over a field are schemes, though there are non quasi-separated group objects that are not schemes.
- Commutative-group objects in the category of algebraic spaces over an arbitrary scheme which are proper, locally finite presentation, flat, and cohomologically flat in dimension 0 are schemes.
- Not every singular algebraic surface is a scheme.
- Hironaka's example can be used to give a non-singular 3-dimensional proper algebraic space that is not a scheme, given by the quotient of a scheme by a group of order 2 acting freely. This illustrates one difference between schemes and algebraic spaces: the quotient of an algebraic space by a discrete group acting freely is an algebraic space, but the quotient of a scheme by a discrete group acting freely need not be a scheme (even if the group is finite).
- Every quasi-separated algebraic space contains a dense open affine subscheme, and the complement of such a subscheme always has codimension ≥ 1. Thus algebraic spaces are in a sense "close" to affine schemes.
- The quotient of the complex numbers by a lattice is an algebraic space, but is not an elliptic curve, even though the corresponding analytic space is an elliptic curve (or more precisely is the image of an elliptic curve under the functor from complex algebraic spaces to analytic spaces). In fact this algebraic space quotient is not a scheme, is not complete, and is not even quasi-separated. This shows that although the quotient of an algebraic space by an infinite discrete group is an algebraic space, it can have strange properties and might not be the algebraic space one was "expecting". Similar examples are given by the quotient of the complex affine line by the integers, or the quotient of the complex affine line minus the origin by the powers of some number: again the corresponding analytic space is a variety, but the algebraic space is not.

== Algebraic spaces and analytic spaces ==
Algebraic spaces over the complex numbers are closely related to analytic spaces and Moishezon manifolds.

Roughly speaking, the difference between complex algebraic spaces and analytic spaces is that complex algebraic spaces are formed by gluing affine pieces together using the étale topology, while analytic spaces are formed by gluing with the classical topology. In particular there is a functor from complex algebraic spaces of finite type to analytic spaces. Hopf manifolds give examples of analytic surfaces that do not come from a proper algebraic space (though one can construct non-proper and non-separated algebraic spaces whose analytic space is the Hopf surface). It is also possible for different algebraic spaces to correspond to the same analytic space: for example, an elliptic curve and the quotient of C by the corresponding lattice are not isomorphic as algebraic spaces, but the corresponding analytic spaces are isomorphic.

Artin showed that proper algebraic spaces over the complex numbers are more or less the same as Moishezon spaces.

== Generalization ==
A far-reaching generalization of algebraic spaces is given by algebraic stacks. In the category of stacks we can form even more quotients by group actions than in the category of algebraic spaces (the resulting quotient is called a quotient stack).
