= Normal cone (algebraic geometry) =

Scheme in algebraic geometry

In algebraic geometry, the normal cone of a subscheme of a scheme is a scheme analogous to the normal bundle or tubular neighborhood in differential geometry.

== Definition ==
The normal cone C_{X}Y or $C_{X/Y}$ of an embedding i: X → Y, defined by some sheaf of ideals I, is defined as the relative Spec
$$\operatorname{Spec}_X \left(\bigoplus_{n = 0}^{\infty} I^n / I^{n+1}\right).$$

When the embedding i is regular the normal cone is the normal bundle, the vector bundle on X corresponding to the dual of the sheaf I/I^{2}.

If X is a point, then the normal cone and the normal bundle to it are also called the tangent cone and the tangent space (Zariski tangent space) to the point. When Y = Spec R is affine, the definition means that the normal cone to X = Spec R/I is the Spec of the associated graded ring of R with respect to I.

If Y is the product X × X and the embedding i is the diagonal embedding, then the normal bundle to X in Y is the tangent bundle to X.

The normal cone (or rather its projective cousin) appears as a result of blow-up. Precisely, let
$$\pi: \operatorname{Bl}_X Y = \operatorname{Proj}_Y \left(\bigoplus_{n=0}^{\infty} I^n\right) \to Y$$
be the blow-up of Y along X. Then, by definition, the exceptional divisor is the pre-image $E = \pi^{-1}(X)$; which is the projective cone of $\bigoplus_0^{\infty} I^n \otimes_{\mathcal{O}_Y} \mathcal{O}_X = \bigoplus_0^{\infty} I^n/I^{n+1}$. Thus,
$$E = \mathbb{P}(C_X Y).$$

The global sections of the normal bundle classify embedded infinitesimal deformations of Y in X; there is a natural bijection between the set of closed subschemes of Y ×_{k} D, flat over the ring D of dual numbers and having X as the special fiber, and H^{0}(X, N_{X} Y).

== Properties ==
=== Compositions of regular embeddings ===
If $i: X \hookrightarrow Y, \, j: Y \hookrightarrow Z$ are regular embeddings, then $j \circ i$ is a regular embedding and there is a natural exact sequence of vector bundles on X:
$$0\to N_{X/Y} \to N_{X/Z} \to i^* N_{Y/Z} \to 0.$$

If $Y_i \hookrightarrow X$ are regular embeddings of codimensions $c_i$ and if $W := \bigcap_i Y_i \hookrightarrow X$ is a regular embedding of codimension
$$\sum c_i$$
then
$$N_{W/X} = \bigoplus_i N_{Y_i/X}|_W.$$
In particular, if $X \to S$ is a smooth morphism, then the normal bundle to the diagonal embedding
$$\Delta: X \hookrightarrow X \times_S \cdots \times_S X$$
(r-fold) is the direct sum of r − 1 copies of the relative tangent bundle $T_{X/S}$.

If $X \hookrightarrow Y$ is a closed immersion and if $Y' \to Y$ is a flat morphism such that $X' = X \times_Y Y'$, then
$$C_{X'/Y'} = C_{X/Y} \times_X X'.$$

If $X \to S$ is a smooth morphism and $X \hookrightarrow Y$ is a regular embedding, then there is a natural exact sequence of vector bundles on X:
$$0 \to T_{X/S} \to T_{Y/S}|_X \to N_{X/Y} \to 0$$
(which is a special case of an exact sequence for cotangent sheaves).

=== Cartesian square ===
For a Cartesian square of schemes
$$\begin{matrix}
X' & \to & Y' \\
\downarrow & & \downarrow \\
X & \to & Y
\end{matrix}$$
with $f:X' \to X$ the vertical map, there is a closed embedding
$$C_{X'/Y'} \hookrightarrow f^*C_{X/Y}$$
of normal cones.

=== Dimension of components ===
Let $X$ be a scheme of finite type over a field and $W \subset X$ a closed subscheme. If $X$ is of pure dimension r; i.e., every irreducible component has dimension r, then $C_{W/X}$ is also of pure dimension r. (This can be seen as a consequence of #Deformation to the normal cone.) This property is a key to an application in intersection theory: given a pair of closed subschemes $V, X$ in some ambient space, while the scheme-theoretic intersection $V \cap X$ has irreducible components of various dimensions, depending delicately on the positions of $V, X$, the normal cone to $V \cap X$ is of pure dimension.

== Examples ==
Let $D \hookrightarrow X$ be an effective Cartier divisor. Then the normal bundle to it (or equivalently the normal cone to it) is
$$N_{D/X} = \mathcal{O}_D(D) := \mathcal{O}_X(D)|_D.$$

=== Non-regular embedding ===
Consider the non-regular embedding
$$X = \text{Spec}\left( \frac{\mathbb{C}[x,y,z]}{(xz,yz)}\right) \to \mathbb{A}^3$$
then, we can compute the normal cone by first observing
$$\begin{align}
I &= (xz, yz) \\
I^2 &= (x^2z^2, xyz^2, y^2z^2) \\
\end{align}$$
If we make the auxiliary variables $a = xz$ and $b = yz$ we get the relation
$$ya - xb = 0.$$
We can use this to give a presentation of the normal cone as the relative spectrum
$$C_X \mathbb{A}^3 = \text{Spec}_X \left( \frac{\mathcal{O}_X[a,b]}{(ya-xb)} \right)$$
Since $\mathbb{A}^3$ is affine, we can just write out the relative spectrum as the affine scheme
$$C_X \mathbb{A}^3 = \text{Spec}\left( \frac{\mathbb{C}[x,y,z][a,b]}{(xz,yz,ya-xb)} \right)$$
giving us the normal cone.

==== Geometry of this normal cone ====
The normal cone's geometry can be further explored by looking at the fibers for various closed points of $X$. Note that geometrically $X$ is the union of the $xy$-plane $H$ with the $z$-axis $L$,
$$X = H \cup L$$
so the points of interest are smooth points on the plane, smooth points on the axis, and the point on their intersection. Any smooth point on the plane is given by a map
$$\begin{matrix}
x \mapsto z_1 & y \mapsto z_2 & z \mapsto 0
\end{matrix}$$
for $z_1,z_2 \in \mathbb{C}$ and either $z_1 \neq 0$ or $z_2\neq 0$. Since it is arbitrary which point we take, for convenience let us assume $z_1 \neq 0, z_2 = 0$. Hence the fiber of $C_X\mathbb{A}^3$ at the point $p=(z_1,0,0)$ is isomorphic to
$$C_X \mathbb{A}^3 |_p \cong \frac{\mathbb{C}[a,b]}{(z_1b)} \cong \mathbb{C}[a]$$
giving the normal cone as a one dimensional line, as expected. For a point $q$ on the axis, this is given by a map
$$\begin{matrix}
x \mapsto 0 & y \mapsto 0 & z \mapsto z_3
\end{matrix}$$
hence the fiber at the point $q = (0,0,z_3)$ is
$$C_X \mathbb{A}^3 |_q \cong \frac{\mathbb{C}[a,b]}{(0)} \cong \mathbb{C}[a,b]$$
which gives a plane. At the origin $r = (0,0,0)$, the normal cone over that point is again isomorphic to $\mathbb{C}[a,b]$.

=== Nodal cubic ===
For the nodal cubic curve $Y$ given by the polynomial $y^2 + x^2(x-1)$ over $\mathbb{C}$, and $X$ the point at the node, the cone has the isomorphism
$$C_{X/Y} \cong \text{Spec}\left(\mathbb{C}[x,y]/\left(y^2-x^2\right)\right)$$
showing the normal cone has more components than the scheme it lies over.

== Deformation to the normal cone ==
Suppose $i : X \to Y$ is an embedding. This can be deformed to the embedding of $X$ inside the normal cone $C_{X/Y}$ (as the zero section) in the following sense: there is a flat family
$$\pi : M^o_{X/Y} \to \mathbb{P}^1$$
with generic fiber $Y$ and special fiber $C_{X/Y}$ such that there exists a family of closed embeddings
$$X \times \mathbb{P}^1 \hookrightarrow M^o_{X/Y}$$
over $\mathbb{P}^1$ such that

1. Over any point $t \in \mathbb{P}^1-\{0\}$ the associated embeddings are an embedding $X\times\{t\} \hookrightarrow Y$
2. The fiber over $0 \in \mathbb{P}^1$ is the embedding of $X \hookrightarrow C_{X/Y}$ given by the zero section.

This construction defines a tool analogous to differential topology where non-transverse intersections are performed in a tubular neighborhood of the intersection. Now, the intersection of $X$ with a cycle $Z$ in $Y$ can be given as the pushforward of an intersection of $X$ with the pullback of $Z$ in $C_{X/Y}$.

=== Construction ===
One application of this is to define intersection products in the Chow ring. Suppose that X and V are closed subschemes of Y with intersection W, and we wish to define the intersection product of X and V in the Chow ring of Y. Deformation to the normal cone in this case means that we replace the embeddings of X and W in Y and V by their normal cones C_{Y}(X) and C_{W}(V), so that we want to find the product of X and C_{W}V in C_{X}Y. This can be much easier: for example, if X is regularly embedded in Y then its normal cone is a vector bundle, so we are reduced to the problem of finding the intersection product of a subscheme C_{W}V of a vector bundle C_{X}Y with the zero section X. However this intersection product is just given by applying the Gysin isomorphism to C_{W}V.

Concretely, the deformation to the normal cone can be constructed by means of blowup. Precisely, let
$$\pi: M \to Y \times \mathbb{P}^1$$
be the blow-up of $Y \times \mathbb{P}^1$ along $X \times 0$. The exceptional divisor is $\overline{C_X Y} = \mathbb{P}(C_X Y \oplus 1)$, the projective completion of the normal cone; for the notation used here see Cone (algebraic geometry) § Properties. The normal cone $C_X Y$ is an open subscheme of $\overline{C_X Y}$ and $X$ is embedded as a zero-section into $C_X Y$.

Now, we note:

1. The map $\rho: M \to \mathbb{P}^1$, the $\pi$ followed by projection, is flat.
2. There is an induced closed embedding
  $$\widetilde{i}: X \times \mathbb{P}^1 \hookrightarrow M$$
  that is a morphism over $\mathbb{P}^1$.
3. M is trivial away from zero; i.e., $\rho^{-1}(\mathbb{P}^1 - 0)= Y \times (\mathbb{P}^1 - 0)$ and $\widetilde{i}$ restricts to the trivial embedding
  $$X \times (\mathbb{P}^1 - 0) \hookrightarrow Y \times (\mathbb{P}^1 - 0).$$
4. $\rho^{-1}(0)$ as the divisor is the sum
  $$\overline{C_X Y} + \widetilde{Y}$$
  where $\widetilde{Y}$ is the blow-up of Y along X and is viewed as an effective Cartier divisor.
5. As divisors $\overline{C_X Y}$ and $\widetilde{Y}$ intersect at $\mathbb{P}(C)$, where $\mathbb{P}(C)$ sits at infinity in $\overline{C_X Y}$.

Item 1 is clear (check torsion-free-ness). In general, given $X \subset Y$, we have $\operatorname{Bl}_V X \subset \operatorname{Bl}_V Y$. Since $X \times 0$ is already an effective Cartier divisor on $X \times \mathbb{P}^1$, we get
$$X \times \mathbb{P}^1 = \operatorname{Bl}_{X \times 0} X \times \mathbb{P}^1 \hookrightarrow M,$$
yielding $\widetilde{i}$. Item 3 follows from the fact the blowdown map π is an isomorphism away from the center $X \times 0$. The last two items are seen from explicit local computation. Q.E.D.

Now, the last item in the previous paragraph implies that the image of $X \times 0$ in M does not intersect $\widetilde{Y}$. Thus, one gets the deformation of i to the zero-section embedding of X into the normal cone.

== Intrinsic normal cone ==
=== Intrinsic normal bundle ===
Let $X$ be a Deligne–Mumford stack locally of finite type over a field $k$. If $\textbf{L}_X$ denotes the cotangent complex of X relative to $k$, then the intrinsic normal bundle to $X$ is the quotient stack
$$\mathfrak{N}_X := h^1 / h^0(\textbf{L}_{X, \text{fppf}}^{\vee})$$
which is the stack of fppf $\textbf{L}_X^{\vee, 0}$-torsors on $\textbf{L}_X^{\vee, 1}$. A concrete interpretation of this stack quotient can be given by looking at its behavior locally in the étale topos of the stack $X$.

==== Properties of intrinsic normal bundle ====
More concretely, suppose there is an étale morphism $U \to X$ from an affine finite-type $k$-scheme $U$ together with a locally closed immersion $f: U \to M$ into a smooth affine finite-type $k$-scheme $M$. Then one can show
$$\mathfrak{N}_X |_U = [N_{U/M}/f^* T_M]$$
meaning we can understand the intrinsic normal bundle as a stacky incarnation for the failure of the normal sequence
$$\mathcal{T}_U \to \mathcal{T}_M |_U \to \mathcal{N}_{U/M}$$
to be exact on the right hand side. Moreover, for special cases discussed below, we are now considering the quotient as a continuation of the previous sequence as a triangle in some triangulated category. This is because the local stack quotient $[N_{U/M}/f^* T_M]$ can be interpreted as
$$B \mathcal{T}_U = \mathcal{T}_U[+1]$$
in certain cases.

=== Normal cone ===
The intrinsic normal cone to $X$, denoted as $\mathfrak{C}_X$, is then defined by replacing the normal bundle $N_{U/M}$ with the normal cone $C_{U/M}$; i.e.,
$$\mathfrak{C}_X|_U = [C_{U/M} / f^* T_M].$$

Example: One has that $X$ is a local complete intersection if and only if $\mathfrak{C}_X = \mathfrak{N}_X$. In particular, if $X$ is smooth, then $\mathfrak{C}_X = \mathfrak{N}_X = B T_X$ is the classifying stack of the tangent bundle $T_X$, which is a commutative group scheme over $X$.

More generally, let $X \to Y$ is a Deligne-Mumford Type (DM-type) morphism of Artin Stacks which is locally of finite type. Then $\mathfrak{C}_{X/Y} \subseteq \mathfrak{N}_{X/Y}$ is characterised as the closed substack such that, for any étale map $U \to X$ for which $U \to X \to Y$ factors through some smooth map $M \to Y$ (e.g., $\mathbb{A}_Y^n \to Y$), the pullback is:
$$\mathfrak{C}_{X/Y}|_U = [C_{U/M} / T_{M/Y}|_U].$$

== See also ==
- Abelian cone
- Segre class
- Residual intersection
- Virtual fundamental class
