= Sheaf of algebras =

Type of ringed space

In algebraic geometry, a sheaf of algebras on a ringed space X is a sheaf of commutative rings on X that is also a sheaf of $\mathcal{O}_X$-modules. It is quasi-coherent if it is so as a module.

When X is a scheme, just like a ring, one can take the global Spec of a quasi-coherent sheaf of algebras: this results in the contravariant functor $\operatorname{Spec}_X$ from the category of quasi-coherent (sheaves of) $\mathcal{O}_X$-algebras on X to the category of schemes that are affine over X (defined below). Moreover, it is an equivalence: the quasi-inverse is given by sending an affine morphism $f: Y \to X$ to $f_* \mathcal{O}_Y.$

== Affine morphism ==
A morphism of schemes $f: X \to Y$ is called affine if $Y$ has an open affine cover $U_i$'s such that $f^{-1}(U_i)$ are affine. For example, a finite morphism is affine. An affine morphism is quasi-compact and separated; in particular, the direct image of a quasi-coherent sheaf along an affine morphism is quasi-coherent.

The base change of an affine morphism is affine.

Let $f: X \to Y$ be an affine morphism between schemes and $E$ a locally ringed space together with a map $g: E \to Y$. Then the natural map between the sets:

$$\operatorname{Mor}_Y(E, X) \to \operatorname{Hom}_{\mathcal{O}_Y\text{-alg}}(f_* \mathcal{O}_X, g_* \mathcal{O}_E)$$

is bijective.

== Examples ==
- Let $f: \widetilde{X} \to X$ be the normalization of an algebraic variety X. Then, since f is finite, $f_* \mathcal{O}_{\widetilde{X}}$ is quasi-coherent and $\operatorname{Spec}_X(f_* \mathcal{O}_{\widetilde{X}}) = \widetilde{X}$.
- Let $E$ be a locally free sheaf of finite rank on a scheme X. Then $\operatorname{Sym}(E^*)$ is a quasi-coherent $\mathcal{O}_X$-algebra and $\operatorname{Spec}_X(\operatorname{Sym}(E^*)) \to X$ is the associated vector bundle over X (called the total space of $E$.)
- More generally, if F is a coherent sheaf on X, then one still has $\operatorname{Spec}_X(\operatorname{Sym}(F)) \to X$, usually called the abelian hull of F; see Cone (algebraic geometry)#Examples.

== The formation of direct images ==
Given a ringed space S, there is the category $C_S$ of pairs $(f, M)$ consisting of a ringed space morphism $f: X \to S$ and an $\mathcal{O}_X$-module $M$. Then the formation of direct images determines the contravariant functor from $C_S$ to the category of pairs consisting of an $\mathcal{O}_S$-algebra A and an A-module M that sends each pair $(f, M)$ to the pair $(f_* \mathcal{O}, f_* M)$.

Now assume S is a scheme and then let $\operatorname{Aff}_S \subset C_S$ be the subcategory consisting of pairs $(f: X \to S, M)$ such that $f$ is an affine morphism between schemes and $M$ a quasi-coherent sheaf on $X$. Then the above functor determines the equivalence between $\operatorname{Aff}_S$ and the category of pairs $(A, M)$ consisting of an $\mathcal{O}_S$-algebra A and a quasi-coherent $A$-module $M$.

The above equivalence can be used (among other things) to do the following construction. As before, given a scheme S, let A be a quasi-coherent $\mathcal{O}_S$-algebra and then take its global Spec: $f: X = \operatorname{Spec}_S(A) \to S$. Then, for each quasi-coherent A-module M, there is a corresponding quasi-coherent $\mathcal{O}_X$-module $\widetilde{M}$ such that $f_* \widetilde{M} \simeq M,$ called the sheaf associated to M. Put in another way, $f_*$ determines an equivalence between the category of quasi-coherent $\mathcal{O}_X$-modules and the quasi-coherent $A$-modules.

== See also ==
- quasi-affine morphism
- Serre's theorem on affineness
