= Residual intersection =

Problem in algebraic geometry

In algebraic geometry, the problem of residual intersection asks the following:

Given a subset Z in the intersection $\bigcap_{i=1}^r X_i$ of varieties, understand the complement of Z in the intersection; i.e., the residual set to Z.

The intersection determines a class $(X_1 \cdots X_r)$, the intersection product, in the Chow group of an ambient space and, in this situation, the problem is to understand the class, the residual class to Z:

$$(X_1 \cdots X_r) - (X_1 \cdots X_r)^Z$$

where $-^Z$ means the part supported on Z; classically the degree of the part supported on Z is called the equivalence of Z.

The two principal applications are the solutions to problems in enumerative geometry (e.g., Steiner's conic problem) and the derivation of the multiple-point formula, the formula allowing one to count or enumerate the points in a fiber even when they are infinitesimally close.

The problem of residual intersection goes back to the 19th century. The modern formulation of the problems and the solutions is due to Fulton and MacPherson. To be precise, they develop the intersection theory by a way of solving the problems of residual intersections (namely, by the use of the Segre class of a normal cone to an intersection). A generalization to a situation where the assumption on regular embedding is weakened is due to Kleiman (1981).

== Definition ==
The following definition is due to (Kleiman 1981).

Let

$$Z \subset W \subset A$$

be closed embeddings, where A is an algebraic variety and Z, W are closed subschemes. Then, by definition, the residual scheme to Z is

$$R(Z, W) = \mathbf{P}(I(Z, W)^*)$$.

where $\mathbf{P}$ is the projectivization (in the classical sense) and $\mathcal{I}(Z, W) \subset \mathcal{O}_W$ is the ideal sheaf defining $Z \hookrightarrow W$.

Note: if $B(Z, W)$ is the blow-up of $W$ along $Z$, then, for $\mathcal{I} = \mathcal{I}(Z, W)$, the surjection $\operatorname{Sym}(\mathcal{I}) \to \bigoplus_{n=0}^{\infty} \mathcal{I}^n$ gives the closed embedding:

$$B(Z, W) \hookrightarrow R(Z, W)$$,

which is the isomorphism if the inclusion $Z \hookrightarrow W$ is a regular embedding.

Residual intersection formula—Let $N_i = N_{X_i} Y|_Z$.

$$(X_1 \cdots X_r \cdot V)_Z = c(N_1) \cdots c(N_r) s(C_Z V)$$

where s(C_{Z} X) denotes the Segre class of the normal cone to Z in X and the subscript Z signifies the part supported on Z.

If the $Z_i$ are scheme-theoretic connected components of $\bigcap_i X_i$, then

$$(X_1 \cdots X_r) = \sum_i (X_1 \cdots X_r)^{Z_i}$$

For example, if Y is the projective space, then Bézout's theorem says the degree of $\bigcap_i X_i$ is $\prod_i \deg(X_i)$ and so the above is a different way to count the contributions to the degree of the intersection. In fact, in applications, one combines Bézout's theorem.

Let $X_i \hookrightarrow Y$ be regular embeddings of schemes, separated and of finite type over the base field; for example, this is the case if X_{i} are effective Cartier divisors (e.g., hypersurfaces). The intersection product of $X_i$

$$(X_1 \cdots X_r)$$

is an element of the Chow group of Y and it can be written as

$$(X_1 \cdots X_r) = \sum_i m_i \alpha_i$$

where $m_i$ are positive integers.

Given a set S, we let

$$(X_1 \cdots X_r)^S = \sum_{\operatorname{Supp}(\alpha_i) \subset S} m_i \alpha_i.$$

== Formulae ==
=== Quillen's excess-intersection formula ===
The formula in the topological setting is due to Quillen (1971).

Now, suppose we are given Y″ → Y' and suppose i': X' = X ×_{Y} Y' → Y' is regular of codimension d' so that one can define i'^{!} as before. Let F be the excess bundle of i and i^{'}; that is, it is the pullback to X″ of the quotient of N by the normal bundle of i'. Let e(F) be the Euler class (top Chern class) of F, which we view as a homomorphism from A_{k−d'} (X″) to A_{k−d}(X″). Then

Excess intersection formula—$i^! = e(F) {i'}^!$

where i^{!} is determined by the morphism Y″ → Y' → Y.

Finally, it is possible to generalize the above construction and formula to complete intersection morphisms; this extension is discussed in § 6.6. as well as Ch. 17 of loc. cit.

Proof: One can deduce the intersection formula from the rather explicit form of a Gysin homomorphism. Let E be a vector bundle on X of rank r and q: P(E ⊕ 1) → X the projective bundle (here 1 means the trivial line bundle). As usual, we identity P(E ⊕ 1) as a disjoint union of P(E) and E. Then there is the tautological exact sequence

$$0 \to \mathcal{O}(-1) \to q^*E \oplus 1 \to \xi \to 0$$

on P(E ⊕ 1). We claim the Gysin homomorphism is given as

$$A_k(E) \to A_{k-r}(X), \, x \mapsto q_*(e(\xi) \overline{x})$$

where e(ξ) = c_{r}(ξ) is the Euler class of ξ and $\overline{x}$ is an element of A_{k}(P(E ⊕ 1)) that restricts to x. Since the injection q^{*}: A_{k−r}(X) → A_{k}(P(E ⊕ 1)) splits, we can write

$$\overline{x} = q^* y + z$$

where z is a class of a cycle supported on P(E). By the Whitney sum formula, we have: c(q^{*}E) = (1 − c_{1}(O(1)))c(ξ) and so

$$e(\xi) = \sum_0^r c_1(\mathcal{O}(1))^i c_{r-i}(q^* E).$$

Then we get:

$$q_*(e(\xi) q^* y) = \sum_{i=0}^r s_{i-r}(E \oplus 1) c_{r-i}(E) y$$

where s_{I}(E ⊕ 1) is the i-th Segre class. Since the zeroth term of a Segre class is the identity and its negative terms are zero, the above expression equals y. Next, since the restriction of ξ to P(E) has a nowhere-vanishing section and z is a class of a cycle supported on P(E), it follows that e(ξ)z = 0. Hence, writing π for the projection map of E and j for the inclusion E to P(E⊕1), we get:

$$\pi^* q_*(e(\xi) \overline{x}) = \pi^*(y) = j^* q^* y = j^*(\overline{x} - z) = j^*(\overline{x}) = x$$

where the second-to-last equality is because of the support reason as before. This completes the proof of the explicit form of the Gysin homomorphism.

The rest is formal and straightforward. We use the exact sequence

$$0 \to \xi' \to \xi \to r^* F \to 0$$

where r is the projection map for . Writing P for the closure of the specialization of V, by the Whitney sum formula and the projection formula, we have:

$$i^!(V) = r_*(e(\xi) P) = r_*(e(r^*F) e(\xi') P) = e(F) r_*(e(\xi') P) = e(F) {i'}^!(V).$$

$\square$

One special case of the formula is the self-intersection formula, which says: given a regular embedding i: X → Y with normal bundle N,

$$i^*i_* = e(N).$$

(To get this, take Y' = Y″ = X.) For example, from this and the projection formula, when X, Y are smooth, one can deduce the formula:

$$i_*(x) i_*(y) = i_*(e(N) xy).$$

in the Chow ring of Y.

Let $f: \widetilde{Y} \to Y$ be the blow-up along a closed subscheme X, $\widetilde{X}$ the exceptional divisor and $g: \widetilde{g}: \widetilde{X} \to X$ the restriction of f. Assume f can be written as a closed immersion followed by a smooth morphism (for example, Y is quasi-projective). Then, from $f^* i_* = i^! g^*$, one gets:

Jouanolou's key formula—$f^* i_* = {i'}_* e(F) g^*$.

== Examples ==
Throughout the example section, the base field is algebraically closed and has characteristic zero. All the examples below (except the first one) are from Fulton (1998).

=== Example: intersection of two plane curves containing the same component ===
Let $C_1 = Z(x_0x_1)$ and $C_2 = Z(x_0x_2)$ be two plane curves in $\mathbb{P}^2$. Set theoretically, their intersection

$$\begin{align}
C_1 \cap C_2 &= Z(x_1,x_2) \cup Z(x_0) \\
&= [1:0:0] \cup \{[0:a:b] \in \mathbb{P}^2 \} \\
&= Z_1\cup Z_2
\end{align}$$

is the union of a point and an embedded $\mathbb{P}^1$. By Bézout's theorem, it is expected this intersection should contain $4$ points since it is the intersection of two conics, so interpreting this intersection requires a residual intersection. Then

$(C_1\cap C_2)^{Z_1} = \left\{ \frac{ c(N_{C_1/\mathbb{P}^2}) c(N_{C_2/\mathbb{P}^2}) }{ c(N_{Z_1/\mathbb{P}^2}) } \right\}_{0} \in A_{0}(Z_1)$ $(C_1\cap C_2)^{Z_2} = \left\{ \frac{ c(N_{C_1/\mathbb{P}^2}) c(N_{C_2/\mathbb{P}^2}) }{ c(N_{Z_2/\mathbb{P}^2}) } \right\}_{1} \in A_{1}(Z_2)$

Since $C_1,C_2$ are both degree $2$ hypersurfaces, their normal bundle is the pullback of $\mathcal{O}(2)$, hence the numerator of the two residual components is

$$\begin{align}
c(\mathcal{O}(2))c(\mathcal{O}(2)) &= (1 + 2[H])(1 + 2[H]) \\
&= 1 + 4[H] + 4[H]^2
\end{align}$$

Because $Z_1$ is given by the vanishing locus $Z(x_1,x_2)$ its normal bundle is $\mathcal{O}(1)\oplus \mathcal{O}(1)$, hence

$$\begin{align}
c(N_{Z_1/\mathbb{P}^2}) &= c(\mathcal{O}(1)\oplus \mathcal{O}(1)) \\
&= (1 + [H])(1 + [H]) \\
&= 1 + 2[H] + [H]^2 \\
&= 1
\end{align}$$

since $Z_1$ is dimension $0$. Similarly, the numerator is also $1$, hence the residual intersection is of degree $1$, as expected since $Z_1$ is the complete intersection given by the vanishing locus $Z(x_1,x_2)$. Also, the normal bundle of $Z_2$ is $\mathcal{O}(1)$ since it is given by the vanishing locus $Z(x_0)$, so

$c(N_{Z_2}/X) = 1 + [H]$

Inverting $c(N_{Z_2}/X)$ gives the series

$\frac{1}{1 + [H]} = 1 - [H] + [H]^2$

hence

$$\begin{align}
\frac{c(N_{C_1/\mathbb{P}^2}) c(N_{C_2/\mathbb{P}^2})}{c(N_{Z_2/\mathbb{P}^2})}
=& (1 + 4[H] + 4[H]^2)(1 - [H] + [H]^2) \\
=& (1 - [H] + [H]^2) + (4[H] - 4[H]^2) + 4[H]^2 \\
=&1 +3[H] + [H]^2 \\
=&1 + 3[H]
\end{align}$$

giving the residual intersection of $3[H]$ for $Z_2$. Pushing forward these two classes gives $4[H]^2$ in $A^*(\mathbb{P}^2)$, as desired.

=== Example: the degree of a curve in three surfaces ===
Let $X_1, X_2, X_3 \subset \mathbb{P}^3$ be three surfaces. Suppose the scheme-theoretic intersection $\bigcap X_i$ is the disjoint union of a smooth curve C and a zero-dimensional schem S. One can ask: what is the degree of S? This can be answered by #formula.

=== Example: conics tangent to given five lines ===
The plane conics are parametrized by $\mathbb{P}^{\binom{2+2}{2}-1} = \mathbb{P}^5$. Given five general lines $\ell_1, \ldots, \ell_5 \subset \mathbb{P}^2$, let $H_{\ell_i} \subset \mathbb{P}^5$ be the hypersurfaces of conics tangent to $\ell_i$; it can be shown that these hypersurfaces have degree two.

The intersection $\bigcap_i H_{\ell_i}$ contains the Veronese surface $Z \simeq \mathbb{P}^2$ consisting of double lines; it is a scheme-theoretic connected component of $\bigcap_i H_{\ell_i}$. Let $h = c_1(\mathcal{O}_Z(1))$ be the hyperplane class = the first Chern class of O(1) in the Chow ring of Z. Now, $Z = \mathbb{P}^2 \hookrightarrow \mathbb{P}^5$ such that $\mathcal{O}_{\mathbb{P}^5}(1)$ pulls-back to $\mathcal{O}_{\mathbb{P}^2}(2)$ and so the normal bundle to $H_{\ell_i}$ restricted to Z is

$$N_{H_{\ell_i}/\mathbb{P}^5}|_Z = \mathcal{O}_{\mathbb{P}^5}(H_{\ell_i})|_Z = \mathcal{O}_{\mathbb{P}^5}(2)|_Z = \mathcal{O}_Z(4).$$

So, the total Chern class of it is

$$c(N_{H_{\ell_i}/\mathbb{P}^5}|_Z) = 1+4h.$$

Similarly, using that the normal bundle to a regular $X \hookrightarrow Y$ is $T_Y|_X /T_X$ as well as the Euler sequence, we get that the total Chern class of the normal bundle to $Z \hookrightarrow \mathbb{P}^5$ is

$$c(N_{Z/\mathbb{P}^5}) = c(T_{\mathbb{P}^5}|_Z)/c(T_Z) = c(\mathcal{O}_{\mathbb{P}^5}(1)^{\oplus 6}|_Z)/c(\mathcal{O}_{\mathbb{P}^2}(1)^{\oplus 3}) = (1+2h)^6/(1+ h)^3.$$

Thus, the Segre class of $Z \hookrightarrow \mathbb{P}^5$ is

$$s(Z, \mathbb{P}^5) = c(N_{Z/\mathbb{P}^5})^{-1} = 1-9h+51h^2.$$

Hence, the equivalence of Z is

$$\deg((1+4h)^5(1-9h+51h^2))= 160 - 180 + 51 = 31.$$

By Bézout's theorem, the degree of $\bigcap_i H_{\ell_i}$ is $2^5 = 32$ and hence the residual set consists of a single point corresponding to a unique conic tangent to the given all five lines.

Alternatively, the equivalence of Z can be computed by #formula?; since $\deg(c_1(T_{\mathbb{P}^2})) = \deg(c_2(T_{\mathbb{P}^2})) = 3$ and $\deg(Z) = 4$, it is:

$$3 + 4(3) + (40 - 10(6) + 21) \deg(Z) = 31.$$

=== Example: conics tangent to given five conics ===
Suppose we are given five plane conics $C_1, \ldots, C_5 \subset \mathbb{P}^2$ in general positions. One can proceed exactly as in the previous example. Thus, let $H_{C_i} \subset \mathbb{P}^5$ be the hypersurface of conics tangent to $C_i$; it can be shown that it has degree 6. The intersection $\bigcap_i H_{C_i}$ contains the Veronese surface Z of double lines.

=== Example: functoriality of construction of a refined Gysin homomorphism ===
The fuctoriality is the section title refers to: given two regular embedding $X \overset{i}\hookrightarrow Y \overset{j}\hookrightarrow Z$,

$$(j \circ i)^! = j^! \circ i^!$$

where the equality has the following sense:
