= Divisorial scheme =

In algebraic geometry, a divisorial scheme is a scheme admitting an ample family of line bundles, as opposed to an ample line bundle. In particular, a quasi-projective variety is a divisorial scheme and the notion is a generalization of "quasi-projective". It was introduced in (Borelli 1963) (in the case of a variety) as well as in (SGA 6, Exposé II, 2.2.) (in the case of a scheme). The class of divisorial schemes is quite large: it includes affine schemes, separated regular (noetherian) schemes and subschemes of a divisorial scheme (such as projective varieties).

The term divisorial comes from divisors, although a modern formulation does not refer to divisors.

== Definition ==
Here is the definition in SGA 6, which is a more general version of the definition of Borelli. Given a quasi-compact quasi-separated scheme X, a family of invertible sheaves $L_i, i \in I$ on it is said to be an ample family if the open subsets $U_f = \{ f \ne 0 \}, f \in \Gamma(X, L_i^{\otimes n}), i \in I, n \ge 1$ form a base of the (Zariski) topology on X; in other words, there is an open affine cover of X consisting of open sets of such form. A scheme is then said to be divisorial if there exists such an ample family of invertible sheaves.

== Properties and counterexample ==
Since a subscheme of a divisorial scheme is divisorial, "divisorial" is a necessary condition for a scheme to be embedded into a smooth variety (or more generally a separated Noetherian regular scheme). To an extent, it is also a sufficient condition.

A divisorial scheme has the resolution property; i.e., a coherent sheaf is a quotient of a vector bundle. In particular, a scheme that does not have the resolution property is an example of a non-divisorial scheme.

== See also ==
- Jouanolou's trick
