= Quasi-separated morphism =

In algebraic geometry, a morphism of schemes f from X to Y is called quasi-separated if the diagonal map from X to X ×_{Y} X is quasi-compact (meaning that the inverse image of any quasi-compact open set is quasi-compact). A scheme X is called quasi-separated if the morphism to Spec Z is quasi-separated. Quasi-separated algebraic spaces and algebraic stacks and morphisms between them are defined in a similar way, though some authors include the condition that X is quasi-separated as part of the definition of an algebraic space or algebraic stack X. Quasi-separated morphisms were introduced by Grothendieck & Dieudonné (1964, 1.2.1) as a generalization of separated morphisms, which require the diagonal map to be a closed immersion.

All separated morphisms (and all morphisms of Noetherian schemes) are automatically quasi-separated. Quasi-separated morphisms are important for algebraic spaces and algebraic stacks, where many natural morphisms are quasi-separated but not separated.

The condition that a morphism is quasi-separated often occurs together with the condition that it is quasi-compact.

== Topological description ==
We say a topological space X is quasi-separated if the intersection of two open quasi-compact subsets of X is quasi-compact. We say that a continuous map of topological spaces f from X to Y is quasi-separated if the inverse image along f of every open quasi-separated subset of Y is quasi-separated. Then a scheme (resp., a morphism of schemes) is quasi-separated in the scheme-theoretic sense if and only if it is quasi-separated in the topological sense, see Grothendieck & Dieudonné (1964, 1.2.6, 1.2.7).

== Examples ==
- If X is a locally Noetherian scheme then any morphism from X to any scheme is quasi-separated, and in particular X is a quasi-separated scheme.
- Any separated scheme or morphism is quasi-separated.
- The line with two origins over a field is quasi-separated over the field but not separated.
- If X is an "infinite dimensional vector space with two origins" over a field K then the morphism from X to spec K is not quasi-separated. More precisely X consists of two copies of Spec K[x_{1},x_{2},....] glued together by identifying the nonzero points in each copy.
- The quotient of an algebraic space by an infinite discrete group acting freely is often not quasi-separated. For example, if K is a field of characteristic 0 then the quotient of the affine line by the group Z of integers is an algebraic space that is not quasi-separated. This algebraic space is also an example of a group object in the category of algebraic spaces that is not a scheme; quasi-separated algebraic spaces that are group objects are always group schemes. There are similar examples given by taking the quotient of the group scheme G_{m} by an infinite subgroup, or the quotient of the complex numbers by a lattice.
