= Jouanolou's trick =

Theorem in algebraic geometry that builds a homotopy equivalent affine variety

In algebraic geometry, Jouanolou's trick is a theorem that asserts, for an algebraic variety X, the existence of a surjection with affine space fibers from an affine variety W to X. Moreover, the variety W is homotopy-equivalent to X, and W has the technically advantageous property of being affine. Jouanolou's original statement of the theorem required that X be quasi-projective over an affine scheme, but this has since been considerably weakened.

== Jouanolou's construction ==
Jouanolou's original statement was:

If X is a scheme quasi-projective over an affine scheme, then there exists a vector bundle E over X and an affine E-torsor W.

By the definition of a torsor, W comes with a surjective map to X and is Zariski-locally on X an affine space bundle.

Jouanolou's proof used an explicit construction. Let S be an affine scheme and $X = \mathbf{P}^r_S$. Interpret the affine space $\mathbf{A}^{(r+1)^2}_S$ as the space of (r + 1) × (r + 1) matrices over S. Within this affine space, there is a closed subvariety W consisting of idempotent matrices of rank 1. The image of such a matrix is therefore a point in X, and the map $W \to X$ that sends a matrix to the point corresponding to its image is the map claimed in the statement of the theorem. To show that this map has the desired properties, Jouanolou notes that there is a short exact sequence of vector bundles:

$$0 \to \mathcal{O}_X(-1) \to \mathcal{O}_X^{\oplus r + 1} \to \mathcal{F} \to 0,$$

where the first map is defined by multiplication by a basis of sections of $\mathcal{O}_X(1)$ and the second map is the cokernel. Jouanolou then asserts that W is a torsor for $\mathcal{E} = \operatorname{Hom}(\mathcal{F}, \mathcal{O}_X(-1))$.

Jouanolou deduces the theorem in general by reducing to the above case. If X is projective over an affine scheme S, then it admits a closed immersion into some projective space $\mathbf{P}^r_S$. Pulling back the variety W constructed above for $\mathbf{P}^r_S$ along this immersion yields the desired variety W for X. Finally, if X is quasi-projective, then it may be realized as an open subscheme of a projective S-scheme. Blow up the complement of X to get $\bar X$, and let $i \colon X \to \bar X$ denote the inclusion morphism. The complement of X in $\bar X$ is a Cartier divisor, and therefore i is an affine morphism. Now perform the previous construction for $\bar X$ and pull back along i.

== Thomason's construction ==
Robert Thomason observed that, by making a less explicit construction, it was possible to obtain the same conclusion under significantly weaker hypotheses. Thomason's construction first appeared in a paper of Weibel. Thomason's theorem asserts:

Let X be a quasicompact and quasiseparated scheme with an ample family of line bundles. Then an affine vector bundle torsor over X exists.

Having an ample family of line bundles was first defined in SGA 6 Exposé II Définition 2.2.4. Any quasi-projective scheme over an affine scheme has an ample family of line bundles, as does any separated locally factorial Noetherian scheme.

Thomason's proof abstracts the key features of Jouanolou's. By hypothesis, X admits a set of line bundles L_{0}, ..., L_{N} and sections s_{0}, ..., s_{N} whose non-vanishing loci are affine and cover X. Define X_{i} to be the non-vanishing locus of s_{i}, and define $\mathcal{E}$ to be the direct sum of L_{0}, ..., L_{N}. The sections define a morphism of vector bundles $s = (s_0, \ldots, s_N) \colon \mathcal{O}_X \to \mathcal{E}$. Define $\mathcal{F}$ to be the cokernel of s. On X_{i}, s is a split monomorphism since it is inverted by the inverse of s_{i}. Therefore $\mathcal{F}$ is a vector bundle over X_{i}, and because these open sets cover X, $\mathcal{F}$ is a vector bundle.

Define $\mathbf{P}(\mathcal{E}) = \operatorname{Proj} \operatorname{Sym}^* \mathcal{E}$ and similarly for $\mathbf{P}(\mathcal{F})$. Let W be the complement of $\mathbf{P}(\mathcal{F})$ in $\mathbf{P}(\mathcal{E})$. There is an equivalent description of W as $\operatorname{Spec}(\operatorname{Sym}^* \mathcal{E} / (s - 1))$, and from this description, it is easy to check that it is a torsor for $\mathcal{F}$. Therefore the projection $\pi \colon W \to X$ is affine. To see that W is itself affine, apply a criterion of Serre (EGA II 5.2.1(b), EGA IV_{1} 1.7.17). Each s_{i} determines a global section f_{i} of W. The non-vanishing locus W_{i} of f_{i} is contained in $\pi^{-1}(X_i)$, which is affine, and hence W_{i} is affine. The sum of the sections f_{0}, ..., f_{N} is 1, so the ideal they generate is the ring of global sections. Serre's criterion now implies that W is affine.
