= Affine cone =

Affine cone may refer to:

- Convex cone § Affine convex cones
- Cone (algebraic geometry)
