= Segre class =

In mathematics, the Segre class is a characteristic class used in the study of cones, a generalization of vector bundles. For vector bundles the total Segre class is inverse to the total Chern class, and thus provides equivalent information; the advantage of the Segre class is that it generalizes to more general cones, while the Chern class does not. The Segre class was introduced in the non-singular case by Beniamino Segre (1953). In the modern treatment of intersection theory in algebraic geometry, as developed e.g. in the definitive book of Fulton (1998), Segre classes play a fundamental role.

== Definition ==
Suppose that $C$ is a cone over $X$, that $q$ is the projection from the projective completion $\mathbb{P}(C \oplus 1)$ of $C$ to $X$, and that $\mathcal{O}(1)$ is the anti-tautological line bundle on $\mathbb{P}(C \oplus 1)$. Viewing the Chern class $c_1(\mathcal{O}(1))$ as a group endomorphism of the Chow group of $\mathbb{P}(C \oplus 1)$, the total Segre class of $C$ is given by:

$$s(C) = q_* \left( \sum_{i \geq 0} c_1(\mathcal{O}(1))^{i} [\mathbb{P}(C \oplus 1)] \right).$$

The $i$th Segre class $s_i(C)$ is simply the $i$th graded piece of $s(C)$. If $C$ is of pure dimension $r$ over $X$ then this is given by:

$$s_i(C) = q_* \left( c_1(\mathcal{O}(1))^{r+i} [\mathbb{P}(C \oplus 1)] \right).$$

The reason for using $\mathbb{P}(C \oplus 1)$ rather than $\mathbb{P}(C)$ is that this makes the total Segre class stable under addition of the trivial bundle $\mathcal{O}$.

If Z is a closed subscheme of an algebraic scheme X, then $s(Z, X)$ denotes the Segre class of the normal cone to $Z \hookrightarrow X$.

=== Relation to Chern classes for vector bundles ===
For a holomorphic vector bundle $E$ over a complex manifold $M$ a total Segre class $s(E)$ is the inverse to the total Chern class $c(E)$, see e.g. Fulton (1998).

Explicitly, for a total Chern class

$$c(E) = 1+c_1(E) + c_2(E) + \cdots \,$$

one gets the total Segre class

$$s(E) = 1 + s_1 (E) + s_2 (E) + \cdots \,$$

where

$$c_1(E) = -s_1(E), \quad c_2(E) = s_1(E)^2 - s_2(E), \quad \dots, \quad c_n(E) = -s_1(E)c_{n-1}(E) - s_2(E) c_{n-2}(E) - \cdots - s_n(E)$$

Let $x_1, \dots, x_k$ be Chern roots, i.e. formal eigenvalues of $\frac{ i \Omega }{ 2\pi}$ where $\Omega$ is a curvature of a connection on $E$.

While the Chern class c(E) is written as

$$c(E)  = \prod_{i=1}^{k} (1+x_i) = c_0 + c_1 + \cdots + c_k \,$$

where $c_i$ is an elementary symmetric polynomial of degree $i$ in variables $x_1, \dots, x_k$,

the Segre for the dual bundle $E^\vee$ which has Chern roots $-x_1, \dots, -x_k$ is written as

$$s(E^\vee) = \prod_{i=1}^{k} \frac {1} { 1 -  x_i } = s_0 + s_1 + \cdots$$

Expanding the above expression in powers of $x_1, \dots x_k$ one can see that $s_i (E^\vee)$ is represented by a complete homogeneous symmetric polynomial of $x_1, \dots x_k$.

== Properties ==
Here are some basic properties.

- For any cone C (e.g., a vector bundle), $s(C \oplus 1) = s(C)$.
- For a cone C and a vector bundle E,
  $c(E)s(C \oplus E) = s(C).$
- If E is a vector bundle, then
  $s_i(E) = 0$ for $i < 0$.
  $s_0(E)$ is the identity operator.
  $s_i(E) \circ s_j(F) = s_j(F) \circ s_i(E)$ for another vector bundle F.
- If L is a line bundle, then $s_1(L) = -c_1(L)$, minus the first Chern class of L.
- If E is a vector bundle of rank $e + 1$, then, for a line bundle L,
  $s_p(E \otimes L) = \sum_{i=0}^p (-1)^{p-i} \binom{e+p}{e+i} s_i(E) c_1(L)^{p-i}.$

A key property of a Segre class is birational invariance: this is contained in the following. Let $p: X \to Y$ be a proper morphism between algebraic schemes such that $Y$ is irreducible and each irreducible component of $X$ maps onto $Y$. Then, for each closed subscheme $W \subset Y$, $V = p^{-1}(W)$ and $p_V: V \to W$ the restriction of $p$,

${p_V}_*(s(V, X)) = \operatorname{deg}(p) \, s(W, Y).$

Similarly, if $f: X \to Y$ is a flat morphism of constant relative dimension between pure-dimensional algebraic schemes, then, for each closed subscheme $W \subset Y$, $V = f^{-1}(W)$ and $f_V: V \to W$ the restriction of $f$,

${f_V}^*(s(W, Y)) = s(V, X).$

A basic example of birational invariance is provided by a blow-up. Let $\pi: \widetilde{X} \to X$ be a blow-up along some closed subscheme Z. Since the exceptional divisor $E := \pi^{-1}(Z) \hookrightarrow \widetilde{X}$ is an effective Cartier divisor and the normal cone (or normal bundle) to it is $\mathcal{O}_E(E) := \mathcal{O}_X(E)|_E$,

$$\begin{align}
s(E, \widetilde{X}) &= c(\mathcal{O}_E(E))^{-1} [E] \\
&= [E] - E \cdot [E] + E \cdot (E \cdot [E]) + \cdots,
\end{align}$$

where we used the notation $D \cdot \alpha = c_1(\mathcal{O}(D))\alpha$. Thus,

$$s(Z, X) = g_* \left( \sum_{k=1}^{\infty} (-1)^{k-1} E^k \right)$$

where $g: E = \pi^{-1}(Z) \to Z$ is given by $\pi$.

== Examples ==
=== Example 1 ===
Let Z be a smooth curve that is a complete intersection of effective Cartier divisors $D_1, \dots, D_n$ on a variety X. Assume the dimension of X is n + 1. Then the Segre class of the normal cone $C_{Z/X}$ to $Z \hookrightarrow X$ is:

$$s(C_{Z/X}) = [Z] - \sum_{i=1}^n D_i \cdot [Z].$$

Indeed, for example, if Z is regularly embedded into X, then, since $C_{Z/X} = N_{Z/X}$ is the normal bundle and $N_{Z/X} = \bigoplus_{i=1}^n N_{D_i/X}|_Z$ (see Normal cone#Properties), we have:

$$s(C_{Z/X}) = c(N_{Z/X})^{-1}[Z] = \prod_{i=1}^d (1-c_1(\mathcal{O}_X(D_i))) [Z] = [Z] - \sum_{i=1}^n D_i \cdot [Z].$$

=== Example 2 ===
The following is Example 3.2.22. of Fulton (1998). It recovers some classical results from Schubert's book on enumerative geometry.

Viewing the dual projective space $\breve{\mathbb{P}^3}$ as the Grassmann bundle $p: \breve{\mathbb{P}^3} \to *$ parametrizing the 2-planes in $\mathbb{P}^3$, consider the tautological exact sequence

$$0 \to S \to p^* \mathbb{C}^3 \to Q \to 0$$

where $S, Q$ are the tautological sub and quotient bundles. With $E = \operatorname{Sym}^2(S^* \otimes Q^*)$, the projective bundle $q: X = \mathbb{P}(E) \to \breve{\mathbb{P}^3}$ is the variety of conics in $\mathbb{P}^3$. With $\beta = c_1(Q^*)$, we have $c(S^* \otimes Q^*) = 2 \beta + 2\beta^2$ and so, using Chern class#Computation formulae,

$$c(E) = 1 + 8 \beta + 30 \beta^2 + 60 \beta^3$$

and thus

$$s(E) = 1 + 8 h + 34 h^2 + 92 h^3$$

where $h = -\beta = c_1(Q).$ The coefficients in $s(E)$ have the enumerative geometric meanings; for example, 92 is the number of conics meeting 8 general lines.

=== Example 3 ===
Let X be a surface and $A, B, D$ effective Cartier divisors on it. Let $Z \subset X$ be the scheme-theoretic intersection of $A + D$ and $B + D$ (viewing those divisors as closed subschemes). For simplicity, suppose $A, B$ meet only at a single point P with the same multiplicity m and that P is a smooth point of X. Then

$$s(Z, X) = [D] + (m^2[P] - D \cdot [D]).$$

To see this, consider the blow-up $\pi: \widetilde{X} \to X$ of X along P and let $g: \widetilde{Z} = \pi^{-1}Z \to Z$, the strict transform of Z. By the formula at #Properties,

$$s(Z, X) = g_* ([\widetilde{Z}]) - g_*(\widetilde{Z} \cdot [\widetilde{Z}]).$$

Since $\widetilde{Z} = \pi^* D + mE$ where $E = \pi^{-1} P$, the formula above results.

== Multiplicity along a subvariety ==
Let $(A, \mathfrak{m})$ be the local ring of a variety X at a closed subvariety V codimension n (for example, V can be a closed point). Then $\operatorname{length}_A(A/\mathfrak{m}^t)$ is a polynomial of degree n in t for large t; i.e., it can be written as ${ e(A)^n \over n!} t^n +$ the lower-degree terms and the integer $e(A)$ is called the multiplicity of A.

The Segre class $s(V, X)$ of $V \subset X$ encodes this multiplicity: the coefficient of $[V]$ in $s(V, X)$ is $e(A)$.

== Bibliography ==
- Fulton, William (1998), Intersection theory, Ergebnisse der Mathematik und ihrer Grenzgebiete. 3. Folge., vol. 2 (2nd ed.), Berlin, New York: Springer-Verlag, ISBN 978-3-540-62046-4, MR 1644323
- Segre, Beniamino (1953), "Nuovi metodi e resultati nella geometria sulle varietà algebriche", Ann. Mat. Pura Appl. (in Italian), 35 (4): 1–127, MR 0061420
