= Cone (algebraic geometry) =

Generalization of a vector bundle

In algebraic geometry, a cone is a generalization of a vector bundle. Specifically, given a scheme X, the relative Spec

$$C = \operatorname{Spec}_X R$$

of a quasi-coherent graded O_{X}-algebra R is called the cone or affine cone of R. Similarly, the relative Proj

$$\mathbb{P}(C) = \operatorname{Proj}_X R$$

is called the projective cone of C or R.

Note: The cone comes with the $\mathbb{G}_m$-action due to the grading of R; this action is a part of the data of a cone (whence the terminology).

== Examples ==
- If X = Spec k is a point and R is a homogeneous coordinate ring, then the affine cone of R is the (usual) affine cone over the projective variety corresponding to R.
- If $R = \bigoplus_0^\infty I^n/I^{n+1}$ for some ideal sheaf I, then $\operatorname{Spec}_X R$ is the normal cone to the closed scheme determined by I.
- If $R = \bigoplus_0^\infty L^{\otimes n}$ for some line bundle L, then $\operatorname{Spec}_X R$ is the total space of the dual of L.
- More generally, given a vector bundle (finite-rank locally free sheaf) E on X, if R=Sym(E^{*}) is the symmetric algebra generated by the dual of E, then the cone $\operatorname{Spec}_X R$ is the total space of E, often written just as E, and the projective cone $\operatorname{Proj}_X R$ is the projective bundle of E, which is written as $\mathbb{P}(E)$.
- Let $\mathcal{F}$ be a coherent sheaf on a Deligne–Mumford stack X. Then let $C(\mathcal{F}) := \operatorname{Spec}_X(\operatorname{Sym}(\mathcal{F})).$ For any $f: T \to X$, since global Spec is a right adjoint to the direct image functor, we have: $C(\mathcal{F})(T) = \operatorname{Hom}_{\mathcal{O}_X}(\operatorname{Sym}(\mathcal{F}), f_* \mathcal{O}_T)$; in particular, $C(\mathcal{F})$ is a commutative group scheme over X.
- Let R be a graded $\mathcal{O}_X$-algebra such that $R_0 = \mathcal{O}_X$ and $R_1$ is coherent and locally generates R as $R_0$-algebra. Then there is a closed immersion

$$\operatorname{Spec}_X R \hookrightarrow C(R_1)$$

given by $\operatorname{Sym}(R_1) \to R$. Because of this, $C(R_1)$ is called the abelian hull of the cone $\operatorname{Spec}_X R.$ For example, if $R = \oplus_0^{\infty} I^n/I^{n+1}$ for some ideal sheaf I, then this embedding is the embedding of the normal cone into the normal bundle.

=== Computations ===
Consider the complete intersection ideal $(f,g_1,g_2,g_3) \subset \mathbb{C}[x_0,\ldots,x_n]$ and let $X$ be the projective scheme defined by the ideal sheaf $\mathcal{I} = (f)(g_1,g_2,g_3)$. Then, we have the isomorphism of $\mathcal{O}_{\mathbb{P}^n}$-algebras given by

$$\bigoplus_{n\geq 0 } \frac{\mathcal{I}^n}{\mathcal{I}^{n+1}} \cong \frac{\mathcal{O}_X[a,b,c]}{(g_2a - g_1b, g_3a - g_1c, g_3b - g_2c)}$$

== Properties ==
If $S \to R$ is a graded homomorphism of graded O_{X}-algebras, then one gets an induced morphism between the cones:

$$C_R = \operatorname{Spec}_X R \to C_S = \operatorname{Spec}_X S$$.

If the homomorphism is surjective, then one gets closed immersions $C_R \hookrightarrow C_S,\, \mathbb{P}(C_R) \hookrightarrow \mathbb{P}(C_S).$

In particular, assuming R_{0} = O_{X}, the construction applies to the projection $R = R_0 \oplus R_1 \oplus \cdots \to R_0$ (which is an augmentation map) and gives

$$\sigma: X \hookrightarrow C_R$$.

It is a section; i.e., $X \overset{\sigma}\to C_R \to X$ is the identity and is called the zero-section embedding.

Consider the graded algebra R[t] with variable t having degree one: explicitly, the n-th degree piece is

$$R_n \oplus R_{n-1} t \oplus R_{n-2} t^2 \oplus \cdots \oplus R_0 t^n$$.

Then the affine cone of it is denoted by $C_{R[t]} = C_R \oplus 1$. The projective cone $\mathbb{P}(C_R \oplus 1)$ is called the projective completion of C_{R}. Indeed, the zero-locus t = 0 is exactly $\mathbb{P}(C_R)$ and the complement is the open subscheme C_{R}. The locus t = 0 is called the hyperplane at infinity.

== O(1) ==
Let R be a quasi-coherent graded O_{X}-algebra such that R_{0} = O_{X} and R is locally generated as O_{X}-algebra by R_{1}. Then, by definition, the projective cone of R is:

$$\mathbb{P}(C) = \operatorname{Proj}_X R = \varinjlim \operatorname{Proj}(R(U))$$

where the colimit runs over open affine subsets U of X. By assumption R(U) has finitely many degree-one generators x_{i}'s. Thus,

$$\operatorname{Proj}(R(U)) \hookrightarrow \mathbb{P}^r \times U.$$

Then $\operatorname{Proj}(R(U))$ has the line bundle O(1) given by the hyperplane bundle $\mathcal{O}_{\mathbb{P}^r}(1)$ of $\mathbb{P}^r$; gluing such local O(1)'s, which agree locally, gives the line bundle O(1) on $\mathbb{P}(C)$.

For any integer n, one also writes O(n) for the n-th tensor power of O(1). If the cone C=Spec_{X}R is the total space of a vector bundle E, then O(-1) is the tautological line bundle on the projective bundle P(E).

Remark: When the (local) generators of R have degree other than one, the construction of O(1) still goes through but with a weighted projective space in place of a projective space; so the resulting O(1) is not necessarily a line bundle. In the language of divisor, this O(1) corresponds to a Q-Cartier divisor.
