= Ideal sheaf =

In algebraic geometry, an ideal sheaf (or sheaf of ideals) is the global analogue of an ideal in a ring. The ideal sheaves on a geometric object are closely connected to its subspaces.

== Definition ==
Let $X$ be a topological space and $A$ a sheaf of rings on $X$; i.e., let $(X,A)$ be a ringed space. An ideal sheaf $J$ in $A$ is a subobject of $A$ in the category of sheaves of $A$-modules, i.e., a subsheaf of $A$ viewed as a sheaf of abelian groups such that

$$\Gamma(U,A)\cdot\Gamma(U,J)\subseteq \Gamma(U,J)$$

for all open subsets $U$ of $X$. In other words, $J$ is a sheaf of A-submodules of $A$.

== General properties ==
If $f:A\to B$ is a homomorphism between two sheaves of rings on the same space $X$, the kernel of $f$ is an ideal sheaf in $A$.

Conversely, for any ideal sheaf $J$ in a sheaf of rings $A$, there is a natural structure of a sheaf of rings on the quotient sheaf $A/J$. Note that the canonical map

$$\Gamma(U,A)/\Gamma(U,J) \to \Gamma(U,A/J)$$

for open subsets $U$ is injective, but not surjective in general (see sheaf cohomology).

== Motivation ==
In the context of schemes, the importance of ideal sheaves lies mainly in the correspondence between closed subschemes and quasi-coherent ideal sheaves. Consider a scheme $X$ and a quasi-coherent ideal sheaf $J$ in $\mathcal{O}_X$. Then, the support $Z$ of $\mathcal{O}_X/J$ is a closed subspace of $X$, and $(Z,\mathcal{O}_X/J)$ is a scheme (both assertions can be checked locally). It is called the closed subscheme of $X$ defined by $J$. Conversely, let $i:Z\to X$ be a closed immersion, i.e., a morphism which is a homeomorphism onto a closed subspace such that the associated map

$$i^\# : \mathcal{O}_X\to i_*\mathcal{O}_Z$$

is surjective on the stalks. Then, the kernel $J$ of $i^\#$ is a quasi-coherent ideal sheaf, and $i$ induces an isomorphism from $Z$ onto the closed subscheme defined by $J$.

A particular case of this correspondence is the unique reduced subscheme $X_{\mathrm{red}}$ of $X$ having the same underlying space, which is defined by the nilradical of $\mathcal{O}_X$ (defined stalk-wise, or on open affine charts).

For a morphism $f:X\to Y$ and a closed subscheme $Y'\subseteq Y$ defined by an ideal sheaf $J$, the preimage $Y'\times_Y X$ is defined by the ideal sheaf

$$f^*(J)\mathcal{O}_X = \operatorname{im}(f^*J\to \mathcal{O}_X)$$.

The pull-back of an ideal sheaf $J$ to the subscheme $Z$ defined by $J$ contains important information, it is called the conormal bundle of $Z$. For example, the sheaf of Kähler differentials may be defined as the pull-back of the ideal sheaf defining the diagonal $X\to X\times X$ to $X$. (Assume for simplicity that $X$ is separated so that the diagonal is a closed immersion.)

== Analytic geometry ==
In the theory of complex-analytic spaces, the Oka-Cartan theorem states that a closed subset $A$ of a complex space is analytic if and only if the ideal sheaf of functions vanishing on $A$ is coherent. This ideal sheaf also gives $A$ the structure of a reduced closed complex subspace.
