= Regular embedding =

In algebraic geometry, a closed immersion $i: X \hookrightarrow Y$ of schemes is a regular embedding of codimension r if each point x in X has an open affine neighborhood U in Y such that the ideal of $X \cap U$ is generated by a regular sequence of length r. A regular embedding of codimension one is precisely an effective Cartier divisor.

== Examples and usage ==
For example, if X and Y are smooth over a scheme S and if i is an S-morphism, then i is a regular embedding. In particular, every section of a smooth morphism is a regular embedding. If $\operatorname{Spec}B$ is regularly embedded into a regular scheme, then B is a complete intersection ring.

The notion is used, for instance, in an essential way in Fulton's approach to intersection theory. The important fact is that when i is a regular embedding, if I is the ideal sheaf of X in Y, then the normal sheaf, the dual of $I/I^2$, is locally free (thus a vector bundle) and the natural map $\operatorname{Sym}(I/I^2) \to \oplus_0^\infty I^n/I^{n+1}$ is an isomorphism: the normal cone $\operatorname{Spec}(\oplus_0^\infty I^n/I^{n+1})$ coincides with the normal bundle.

=== Non-examples ===
One non-example is a scheme which isn't equidimensional. For example, the scheme

$$X = \text{Spec}\left( \frac{\mathbb{C}[x,y,z]}{(xz,yz)}\right)$$

is the union of $\mathbb{A}^2$ and $\mathbb{A}^1$. Then, the embedding $X \hookrightarrow \mathbb{A}^3$ isn't regular since taking any non-origin point on the $z$-axis is of dimension $1$ while any non-origin point on the $xy$-plane is of dimension $2$.

== Local complete intersection morphisms and virtual tangent bundles ==
A morphism of finite type $f:X \to Y$ is called a (local) complete intersection morphism if each point x in X has an open affine neighborhood U so that f |_{U} factors as $U \overset{j}\to V \overset{g}\to Y$ where j is a regular embedding and g is smooth. For example, if f is a morphism between smooth varieties, then f factors as $X \to X \times Y \to Y$ where the first map is the graph morphism and so is a complete intersection morphism. Notice that this definition is compatible with the one in EGA IV for the special case of flat morphisms.

Let $f: X \to Y$ be a local-complete-intersection morphism that admits a global factorization: it is a composition $X \overset{i}\hookrightarrow P \overset{p}\to Y$ where $i$ is a regular embedding and $p$ a smooth morphism. Then the virtual tangent bundle is an element of the Grothendieck group of vector bundles on X given as:

$$T_f = [i^* T_{P/Y}] - [N_{X/P}]$$,

where $T_{P/Y}=\Omega_{P/Y}^{\vee}$ is the relative tangent sheaf of $p$ (which is locally free since $p$ is smooth) and $N$ is the normal sheaf $(\mathcal{I}/\mathcal{I}^2)^{\vee}$ (where $\mathcal{I}$ is the ideal sheaf of $X$ in $P$), which is locally free since $i$ is a regular embedding.

More generally, if $f \colon X \rightarrow Y$ is a any local complete intersection morphism of schemes, its cotangent complex $L_{X/Y}$ is perfect of Tor-amplitude [-1,0]. If moreover $f$ is locally of finite type and $Y$ locally Noetherian, then the converse is also true.

These notions are used for instance in the Grothendieck–Riemann–Roch theorem.

== Non-Noetherian case ==
SGA 6 Exposé VII uses the following slightly weaker form of the notion of a regular embedding, which agrees with the one presented above for Noetherian schemes:

First, given a projective module E over a commutative ring A, an A-linear map $u: E \to A$ is called Koszul-regular if the Koszul complex determined by it is acyclic in dimension > 0 (consequently, it is a resolution of the cokernel of u). Then a closed immersion $X \hookrightarrow Y$ is called Koszul-regular if the ideal sheaf determined by it is such that, locally, there are a finite free A-module E and a Koszul-regular surjection from E to the ideal sheaf.

It is this Koszul regularity that was used in SGA 6 for the definition of local complete intersection morphisms; it is indicated there that Koszul-regularity was intended to replace the definition given earlier in this article and that had appeared originally in the already published EGA IV.

(This questions arises because the discussion of zero-divisors is tricky for non-Noetherian rings in that one cannot use the theory of associated primes.)

== See also ==
- Regular submanifold
