= Normal bundle =

Concept in mathematics

In differential geometry, a field of mathematics, a normal bundle is a particular kind of vector bundle, complementary to the tangent bundle, and coming from an embedding (or immersion).

== Definition ==
=== Riemannian manifold ===
Let $(M,g)$ be a Riemannian manifold, and $S \subset M$ a Riemannian submanifold. Define, for a given $p \in S$, a vector $n \in \mathrm{T}_p M$ to be normal to $S$ whenever $g(n,v)=0$ for all $v\in \mathrm{T}_p S$ (so that $n$ is orthogonal to $\mathrm{T}_p S$). The set $\mathrm{N}_p S$ of all such $n$ is then called the normal space to $S$ at $p$.

Just as the total space of the tangent bundle to a manifold is constructed from all tangent spaces to the manifold, the total space of the normal bundle $\mathrm{N} S$ to $S$ is defined as

$$\mathrm{N}S := \coprod_{p \in S} \mathrm{N}_p S$$.

The conormal bundle is defined as the dual bundle to the normal bundle. It can be realised naturally as a sub-bundle of the cotangent bundle (of $M$).

=== General definition ===
More abstractly, given an immersion $i: N \to M$ (for instance an embedding), one can define a normal bundle of $N$ in $M$, by at each point of $N$, taking the quotient space of the tangent space on $M$ by the tangent space on $N$. For a Riemannian manifold one can identify this quotient with the orthogonal complement, but in general one cannot (such a choice is equivalent to a section of the projection $p:V \to V/W$).

Thus the normal bundle is in general a quotient of the tangent bundle of the ambient space $M$ restricted to the subspace $N$.

Formally, the normal bundle to $N$ in $M$ is a quotient bundle of the tangent bundle on $M$: one has the short exact sequence of vector bundles on $N$:

$$0 \to \mathrm{T}N \to \mathrm{T}M\vert_{i(N)} \to \mathrm{T}_{M/N} := \mathrm{T}M\vert_{i(N)} / \mathrm{T}N \to 0$$

where $\mathrm{T}M\vert_{i(N)}$ is the restriction of the tangent bundle on $M$ to $N$ (properly, the pullback $i^*\mathrm{T}M$ of the tangent bundle on $M$ to a vector bundle on $N$ via the map $i$). The fiber of the normal bundle $\mathrm{T}_{M/N}\overset{\pi}{\twoheadrightarrow} N$ in $p\in N$ is referred to as the normal space at $p$ (of $N$ in $M$).

=== Conormal bundle ===
If $Y\subseteq X$ is a smooth submanifold of a manifold $X$, we can pick local coordinates $(x_1,\dots,x_n)$ around $p\in Y$ such that $Y$ is locally defined by $x_{k+1}=\dots=x_n=0$; then with this choice of coordinates

$$\begin{align}
\mathrm{T}_pX&=\mathbb{R}\Big\lbrace\frac{\partial}{\partial x_1}\Big|_p,\dots, \frac{\partial}{\partial x_k}\Big|_p, \dots, \frac{\partial}{\partial x_n}\Big|_p\Big\rbrace\\
\mathrm{T}_pY&=\mathbb{R}\Big\lbrace\frac{\partial}{\partial x_1}\Big|_p,\dots, \frac{\partial}{\partial x_k}\Big|_p\Big\rbrace\\
{\mathrm{T}_{X/Y}}_p&=\mathbb{R}\Big\lbrace\frac{\partial}{\partial x_{k+1}}\Big|_p,\dots, \frac{\partial}{\partial x_n}\Big|_p\Big\rbrace\\
\end{align}$$

and the ideal sheaf is locally generated by $x_{k+1},\dots,x_n$. Therefore we can define a non-degenerate pairing

$$(I_Y/I_Y^{\ 2})_p\times {\mathrm{T}_{X/Y}}_p\longrightarrow \mathbb{R}$$

that induces an isomorphism of sheaves $\mathrm{T}_{X/Y}\simeq(I_Y/I_Y^{\ 2})^\vee$. We can rephrase this fact by introducing the conormal bundle $\mathrm{T}^*_{X/Y}$ defined via the conormal exact sequence

$$0\to \mathrm{T}^*_{X/Y}\rightarrowtail \Omega^1_X|_Y\twoheadrightarrow \Omega^1_Y\to 0$$,

then $\mathrm{T}^*_{X/Y}\simeq (I_Y/I_Y^{\ 2})$, viz. the sections of the conormal bundle are the cotangent vectors to $X$ vanishing on $\mathrm{T}Y$.

When $Y=\lbrace p\rbrace$ is a point, then the ideal sheaf is the sheaf of smooth germs vanishing at $p$ and the isomorphism reduces to the definition of the tangent space in terms of germs of smooth functions on $X$

$$\mathrm{T}^*_{X/\lbrace p\rbrace}\simeq (\mathrm{T}_pX)^\vee\simeq\frac{\mathfrak{m}_p}{\mathfrak{m}_p^{\ 2}}$$.

== Stable normal bundle ==
Abstract manifolds have a canonical tangent bundle, but do not have a normal bundle: only an embedding (or immersion) of a manifold in another yields a normal bundle. However, since every manifold can be embedded in $\mathbf{R}^{N}$, by the Whitney embedding theorem, every manifold admits a normal bundle, given such an embedding.

There is in general no natural choice of embedding, but for a given manifold $X$, any two embeddings in $\mathbf{R}^N$ for sufficiently large $N$ are regular homotopic, and hence induce the same normal bundle. The resulting class of normal bundles (it is a class of bundles and not a specific bundle because the integer ${N}$ could vary) is called the stable normal bundle.

== Dual to tangent bundle ==
The normal bundle is dual to the tangent bundle in the sense of K-theory: by the above short exact sequence,

$$[\mathrm{T}N] + [\mathrm{T}_{M/N}] = [\mathrm{T}M]$$

in the Grothendieck group. In case of an immersion in $\mathbf{R}^N$, the tangent bundle of the ambient space is trivial (since $\mathbf{R}^N$ is contractible, hence parallelizable), so $[\mathrm{T}N] + [\mathrm{T}_{M/N}] = 0$, and thus $[\mathrm{T}_{M/N}] = -[\mathrm{T}N]$.

This is useful in the computation of characteristic classes, and allows one to prove lower bounds on immersibility and embeddability of manifolds in Euclidean space.

== For symplectic manifolds ==
Suppose a manifold $X$ is embedded in to a symplectic manifold $(M,\omega)$, such that the pullback of the symplectic form has constant rank on $X$. Then one can define the symplectic normal bundle to $X$ as the vector bundle over $X$ with fibres

$$(\mathrm{T}_{i(x)}X)^\omega/(\mathrm{T}_{i(x)}X\cap (\mathrm{T}_{i(x)}X)^\omega), \quad x\in X,$$

where $i:X\rightarrow M$ denotes the embedding and $(\mathrm{T}X)^\omega$ is the symplectic orthogonal of $\mathrm{T}X$ in $\mathrm{T}M$. Notice that the constant rank condition ensures that these normal spaces fit together to form a bundle. Furthermore, any fibre inherits the structure of a symplectic vector space.

By Darboux's theorem, the constant rank embedding is locally determined by $i^*(\mathrm{T}M)$. The isomorphism

$$i^*(\mathrm{T}M)\cong \mathrm{T}X/\nu \oplus (\mathrm{T}X)^\omega/\nu \oplus(\nu\oplus \nu^*)$$

(where $\nu=\mathrm{T}X\cap (\mathrm{T}X)^\omega$ and $\nu^*$ is the dual under $\omega$,) of symplectic vector bundles over $X$ implies that the symplectic normal bundle already determines the constant rank embedding locally. This feature is similar to the Riemannian case.
