= Diagonal morphism (algebraic geometry) =

In algebraic geometry, given a morphism of schemes $p: X \to S$, the diagonal morphism

$$\delta: X \to X \times_S X$$

is a morphism determined by the universal property of the fiber product $X \times_S X$ of p and p applied to the identity $1_X : X \to X$ and the identity $1_X$.

It is a special case of a graph morphism: given a morphism $f: X \to Y$ over S, the graph morphism of it is $X \to X \times_S Y$ induced by $f$ and the identity $1_X$. The diagonal embedding is the graph morphism of $1_X$.

By definition, X is a separated scheme over S ($p: X \to S$ is a separated morphism) if the diagonal morphism is a closed immersion. Also, a morphism $p: X \to S$ locally of finite presentation is an unramified morphism if and only if the diagonal embedding is an open immersion.

== Explanation ==
As an example, consider an algebraic variety over an algebraically closed field k and $p: X \to \operatorname{Spec}(k)$ the structure map. Then, identifying X with the set of its k-rational points, $X \times_k X = \{ (x, y) \in X \times X \}$ and $\delta: X \to X \times_k X$ is given as $x \mapsto (x, x)$; whence the name diagonal morphism.

== Separated morphism ==
A separated morphism is a morphism $f$ such that the fiber product of $f$ with itself along $f$ has its diagonal as a closed subscheme — in other words, the diagonal morphism is a closed immersion.

As a consequence, a scheme $X$ is separated when the diagonal of $X$ within the scheme product of $X$ with itself is a closed immersion. Emphasizing the relative point of view, one might equivalently define a scheme to be separated if the unique morphism $X \rightarrow \textrm{Spec} (\mathbb{Z})$ is separated.

Notice that a topological space Y is Hausdorff iff the diagonal embedding

$$Y \stackrel{\Delta}{\longrightarrow} Y \times Y, \, y \mapsto (y, y)$$

is closed. In algebraic geometry, the above formulation is used because a scheme which is a Hausdorff space is necessarily empty or zero-dimensional. The difference between the topological and algebro-geometric context comes from the topological structure of the fiber product (in the category of schemes) $X \times_{\textrm{Spec} (\mathbb{Z})} X$, which is different from the product of topological spaces.

Any affine scheme Spec A is separated, because the diagonal corresponds to the surjective map of rings (hence is a closed immersion of schemes):

$A \otimes_{\mathbb Z} A \rightarrow A, a \otimes a' \mapsto a \cdot a'$.

Let $S$ be a scheme obtained by identifying two affine lines through the identity map except at the origins (see gluing scheme#Examples). It is not separated. Indeed, the image of the diagonal morphism $S \to S \times S$ image has two origins, while its closure contains four origins.

== Use in intersection theory ==
A classic way to define the intersection product of algebraic cycles $A, B$ on a smooth variety X is by intersecting (restricting) their cartesian product with (to) the diagonal: precisely,

$$A \cdot B = \delta^*(A \times B)$$

where $\delta^*$ is the pullback along the diagonal embedding $\delta: X \to X \times X$.

== See also ==
- Quasi-separated morphism
- Regular embedding
- Diagonal morphism
