= Gluing schemes =

Mathematical concept

In algebraic geometry, a new scheme (e.g. an algebraic variety) can be obtained by gluing existing schemes through gluing maps.

== Statement ==
Suppose there is a (possibly infinite) family of schemes $\{ X_i \}_{i \in I}$ and for pairs $i, j$, there are open subsets $U_{ij}$ and isomorphisms $\varphi_{ij} : U_{ij} \overset{\sim}\to U_{ji}$. Now, if the isomorphisms are compatible in the sense: for each $i, j, k$,

1. $\varphi_{ij} = \varphi_{ji}^{-1}$,
2. $\varphi_{ij}(U_{ij} \cap U_{ik}) = U_{ji} \cap U_{jk}$,
3. $\varphi_{jk} \circ \varphi_{ij} = \varphi_{ik}$ on $U_{ij} \cap U_{ik}$,

then there exists a scheme X, together with the morphisms $\psi_i : X_i \to X$ such that

1. $\psi_i$ is an isomorphism onto an open subset of X,
2. $X = \cup_i \psi_i(X_i),$
3. $\psi_i(U_{ij}) = \psi_i(X_i) \cap \psi_j(X_j),$
4. $\psi_i = \psi_j \circ \varphi_{ij}$ on $U_{ij}$.

== Examples ==
=== Projective line ===
The projective line is obtained by gluing two affine lines so that the origin and illusionary $\infty$ on one line corresponds to illusionary $\infty$ and the origin on the other line, respectively.

Let $X = \operatorname{Spec}(k[t]) \simeq \mathbb{A}^1, Y = \operatorname{Spec}(k[u]) \simeq \mathbb{A}^1$ be two copies of the affine line over a field k. Let $X_t = \{ t \ne 0 \} = \operatorname{Spec}(k[t, t^{-1}])$ be the complement of the origin and $Y_u = \{ u \ne 0 \}$ defined similarly. Let Z denote the scheme obtained by gluing $X, Y$ along the isomorphism $X_t \simeq Y_u$ given by $t^{-1} \leftrightarrow u$; we identify $X, Y$ with the open subsets of Z. Now, the affine rings $\Gamma(X, \mathcal{O}_Z), \Gamma(Y, \mathcal{O}_Z)$ are both polynomial rings in one variable in such a way

$\Gamma(X, \mathcal{O}_Z) = k[s]$ and $\Gamma(Y, \mathcal{O}_Z) = k[s^{-1}]$

where the two rings are viewed as subrings of the function field $k(Z) = k(s)$. But this means that $Z = \mathbb{P}^1$; because, by definition, $\mathbb{P}^1$ is covered by the two open affine charts whose affine rings are of the above form.

=== Affine line with doubled origin ===
Let $X, Y, X_t, Y_u$ be as in the above example. But this time let $Z$ denote the scheme obtained by gluing $X, Y$ along the isomorphism $X_t \simeq Y_u$ given by $t \leftrightarrow u$. So, geometrically, $Z$ is obtained by identifying two parallel lines except the origin; i.e., it is an affine line with the doubled origin. (It can be shown that Z is not a separated scheme.) In contrast, if two lines are glued so that origin on the one line corresponds to the (illusionary) point at infinity for the other line; i.e., use the isomorphism $t^{-1} \leftrightarrow u$, then the resulting scheme is, at least visually, the projective line $\mathbb{P}^1$.

== Fiber products and pushouts of schemes ==
The category of schemes admits finite pullbacks and in some cases finite pushouts; they both are constructed by gluing affine schemes. For affine schemes, fiber products and pushouts correspond to tensor products and fiber squares of algebras.
