= Closed immersion =

In algebraic geometry, a closed immersion of schemes is a morphism of schemes $f: Z \to X$ that identifies Z as a closed subset of X such that locally, regular functions on Z can be extended to X. The latter condition can be formalized by saying that $f^\#:\mathcal{O}_X\rightarrow f_\ast\mathcal{O}_Z$ is surjective.

An example is the inclusion map $\operatorname{Spec}(R/I) \to \operatorname{Spec}(R)$ of affine schemes induced by the canonical ring map $R \to R/I$.

== Other characterizations ==
The following are equivalent:

1. $f: Z \to X$ is a closed immersion.
2. For every open affine $U = \operatorname{Spec}(R) \subset X$, there exists an ideal $I \subset R$ such that $f^{-1}(U) = \operatorname{Spec}(R/I)$ as schemes over U.
3. There exists an open affine covering $X = \bigcup U_j, U_j = \operatorname{Spec} R_j$ and for each j there exists an ideal $I_j \subset R_j$ such that $f^{-1}(U_j) = \operatorname{Spec} (R_j / I_j)$ as schemes over $U_j$.
4. There is a quasi-coherent sheaf of ideals $\mathcal{I}$ on X such that $f_\ast\mathcal{O}_Z\cong \mathcal{O}_X/\mathcal{I}$ and f is an isomorphism of Z onto the global Spec of $\mathcal{O}_X/\mathcal{I}$ over X.

=== Definition for locally ringed spaces ===
In the case of locally ringed spaces a morphism $i:Z\to X$ is a closed immersion if a similar list of criteria is satisfied:

1. The map $i$ is a homeomorphism of $Z$ onto its image
2. The associated sheaf map $\mathcal{O}_X \to i_*\mathcal{O}_Z$ is surjective with kernel $\mathcal{I}$
3. The kernel $\mathcal{I}$ is locally generated by sections as an $\mathcal{O}_X$-module.

The only varying condition is the third. It is instructive to look at a counter-example to get a feel for what the third condition yields by looking at a map which is not a closed immersion, $i:\mathbb{G}_m\hookrightarrow \mathbb{A}^1$ where

$\mathbb{G}_m = \text{Spec}(\mathbb{Z}[x,x^{-1}])$

If we look at the stalk of $i_*\mathcal{O}_{\mathbb{G}_m}|_0$ at $0 \in \mathbb{A}^1$ then there are no sections. This implies for any open subscheme $U \subset \mathbb{A}^1$ containing $0$ the sheaf has no sections. This violates the third condition since at least one open subscheme $U$ covering $\mathbb{A}^1$ contains $0$.

== Properties ==
A closed immersion is finite and radicial (universally injective). In particular, a closed immersion is universally closed. A closed immersion is stable under base change and composition. The notion of a closed immersion is local in the sense that f is a closed immersion if and only if for some (equivalently every) open covering $X=\bigcup U_j$ the induced map $f:f^{-1}(U_j)\rightarrow U_j$ is a closed immersion.

If the composition $Z \to Y \to X$ is a closed immersion and $Y \to X$ is separated, then $Z \to Y$ is a closed immersion. If X is a separated S-scheme, then every S-section of X is a closed immersion.

If $i: Z \to X$ is a closed immersion and $\mathcal{I} \subset \mathcal{O}_X$ is the quasi-coherent sheaf of ideals cutting out Z, then the direct image $i_*$ from the category of quasi-coherent sheaves over Z to the category of quasi-coherent sheaves over X is exact, fully faithful with the essential image consisting of $\mathcal{G}$ such that $\mathcal{I} \mathcal{G} = 0$.

A flat closed immersion of finite presentation is the open immersion of an open closed subscheme.

== See also ==
- Segre embedding
- Regular embedding
