= Degeneration (algebraic geometry) =

In algebraic geometry, a degeneration (or specialization) is the act of taking a limit of a family of varieties. Precisely, given a morphism

$$\pi: \mathcal{X} \to C,$$

of a variety (or a scheme) to a curve C with origin 0 (e.g., affine or projective line), the fibers

$$\pi^{-1}(t)$$

form a family of varieties over C. Then the fiber $\pi^{-1}(0)$ may be thought of as the limit of $\pi^{-1}(t)$ as $t \to 0$. One then says the family $\pi^{-1}(t), t \ne 0$ degenerates to the special fiber $\pi^{-1}(0)$. The limiting process behaves nicely when $\pi$ is a flat morphism and, in that case, the degeneration is called a flat degeneration. Many authors assume degenerations to be flat.

When the family $\pi^{-1}(t)$ is trivial away from a special fiber; i.e., $\pi^{-1}(t)$ is independent of $t \ne 0$ up to (coherent) isomorphisms, $\pi^{-1}(t), t \ne 0$ is called a general fiber.

== Degenerations of curves ==
In the study of moduli of curves, the important point is to understand the boundaries of the moduli, which amounts to understand degenerations of curves.

== Stability of invariants ==
Ruled-ness specializes. Precisely, Matsusaka'a theorem says

Let X be a normal irreducible projective scheme over a discrete valuation ring. If the generic fiber is ruled, then each irreducible component of the special fiber is also ruled.

== Infinitesimal deformations ==
Let D = k[ε] be the ring of dual numbers over a field k and Y a scheme of finite type over k. Given a closed subscheme X of Y, by definition, an embedded first-order infinitesimal deformation of X is a closed subscheme X' of Y ×_{Spec(k)} Spec(D) such that the projection X' → Spec D is flat and has X as the special fiber.

If Y = Spec A and X = Spec(A/I) are affine, then an embedded infinitesimal deformation amounts to an ideal I' of A[ε] such that A[ε]/ I' is flat over D and the image of I' in A = A[ε]/ε is I.

In general, given a pointed scheme (S, 0) and a scheme X, a morphism of schemes π: X' → S is called the deformation of a scheme X if it is flat and the fiber of it over the distinguished point 0 of S is X. Thus, the above notion is a special case when S = Spec D and there is some choice of embedding.

== See also ==
- Deformation theory
- Differential graded Lie algebra
- Kodaira–Spencer map
- Frobenius splitting
- Relative effective Cartier divisor
