= Exalcomm =

In algebra, Exalcomm is a functor classifying the extensions of a commutative algebra by a module. More precisely, the elements of Exalcomm_{k}(R,M) are isomorphism classes of commutative k-algebras E with a homomorphism onto the k-algebra R whose kernel is the R-module M (with all pairs of elements in M having product 0). Note that some authors use Exal as the same functor. There are similar functors Exal and Exan for non-commutative rings and algebras, and functors Exaltop, Exantop, and Exalcotop that take a topology into account.

"Exalcomm" is an abbreviation for "COMMutative ALgebra EXtension" (or rather for the corresponding French phrase). It was introduced by Grothendieck & Dieudonné (1964, 18.4.2).

Exalcomm is one of the André–Quillen cohomology groups and one of the Lichtenbaum–Schlessinger functors.

Given homomorphisms of commutative rings A → B → C and a C-module L there is an exact sequence of A-modules (Grothendieck & Dieudonné 1964, 20.2.3.1)

$$\begin{align}
0 \rightarrow\; &\operatorname{Der}_B(C,L)\rightarrow \operatorname{Der}_A(C,L)\rightarrow \operatorname{Der}_A(B,L)
\rightarrow \\
&\operatorname{Exalcomm}_B(C,L)\rightarrow \operatorname{Exalcomm}_A(C,L)\rightarrow \operatorname{Exalcomm}_A(B,L)
\end{align}$$

where Der_{A}(B,L) is the module of derivations of the A-algebra B with values in L. This sequence can be extended further to the right using André–Quillen cohomology.

== Square-zero extensions ==
In order to understand the construction of Exal, the notion of square-zero extensions must be defined. Fix a topos $T$ and let all algebras be algebras over it. Note that the topos of a point gives the special case of commutative rings, so the topos hypothesis can be ignored on a first reading.

=== Definition ===
In order to define the category $\underline{\text{Exal}}$ we need to define what a square-zero extension actually is. Given a surjective morphism of $A$-algebras $p: E \to B$ it is called a square-zero extension if the kernel $I$ of $p$ has the property $I^2 = (0)$ is the zero ideal.

==== Remark ====
Note that the kernel can be equipped with a $B$-module structure as follows: since $p$ is surjective, any $b \in B$ has a lift to a $x\in E$, so $b \cdot m := x\cdot m$ for $m \in I$. Since any lift differs by an element $k \in I$ in the kernel, and

$$(x + k)\cdot m = x\cdot m + k\cdot m = x\cdot m$$

because the ideal is square-zero, this module structure is well-defined.

=== Examples ===
==== From deformations over the dual numbers ====
Square-zero extensions are a generalization of deformations over the dual numbers. For example, a deformation over the dual numbers

$$\begin{matrix}
\text{Spec}\left( \frac{k[x,y]}{(y^2 - x^3 )} \right) & \to & \text{Spec}\left( \frac{k[x,y][\varepsilon]}{(y^2 - x^3 + \varepsilon)} \right) \\
\downarrow & & \downarrow \\
\text{Spec}(k) & \to & \text{Spec}(k[\varepsilon])
\end{matrix}$$

has the associated square-zero extension

$0 \to (\varepsilon) \to \frac{k[x,y][\varepsilon]}{(y^2 - x^3 + \varepsilon)} \to \frac{k[x,y]}{(y^2 - x^3 )} \to 0$

of $k$-algebras.

==== From more general deformations ====
But, because the idea of square zero-extensions is more general, deformations over $k[\varepsilon_1,\varepsilon_2]$ where $\varepsilon_1\cdot \varepsilon_2 = 0$ will give examples of square-zero extensions.

==== Trivial square-zero extension ====
For a $B$-module $M$, there is a trivial square-zero extension given by $B \oplus M$ where the product structure is given by

$$(b,m)\cdot (b',m') = (bb',bm' + b'm)$$

hence the associated square-zero extension is

$$0 \to M \to B\oplus M \to B \to 0$$

where the surjection is the projection map forgetting $M$.

== Construction ==
The general abstract construction of Exal follows from first defining a category of extensions $\underline{\text{Exal}}$ over a topos $T$ (or just the category of commutative rings), then extracting a subcategory where a base ring $A$ $\underline{\text{Exal}}_A$ is fixed, and then using a functor $\pi:\underline{\text{Exal}}_A(B,-) \to \text{B-Mod}$ to get the module of commutative algebra extensions $\text{Exal}_A(B,M)$ for a fixed $M \in \text{Ob}(\text{B-Mod})$.

=== General Exal ===
For this fixed topos, let $\underline{\text{Exal}}$ be the category of pairs $(A, p:E \to B)$ where $p:E\to B$ is a surjective morphism of $A$-algebras such that the kernel $I$ is square-zero, where morphisms are defined as commutative diagrams between $(A, p:E \to B) \to (A', p':E' \to B')$. There is a functor

$$\pi: \underline{\text{Exal}} \to \text{Algmod}$$

sending a pair $(A, p:E \to B)$ to a pair $(A\to B, I)$ where $I$ is a $B$-module.

=== Exal_{A,} Exal_{A}(B, –) ===
Then, there is an overcategory denoted $\underline{\text{Exal}}_A$ (meaning there is a functor $\underline{\text{Exal}}_A \to {\displaystyle {\underline {\text{Exal}}}}$) where the objects are pairs $(A, p:E \to B)$, but the first ring $A$ is fixed, so morphisms are of the form

$$(A, p:E \to B) \to (A, p':E' \to B')$$

There is a further reduction to another overcategory $\underline{\text{Exal}}_A(B,-)$ where morphisms are of the form

$$(A, p:E \to B) \to (A, p':E' \to B)$$

=== Exal_{A}(B,I) ===
Finally, the category $\underline{\text{Exal}}_A(B,I)$ has a fixed kernel of the square-zero extensions. Note that in $\text{Algmod}$, for a fixed $A,B$, there is the subcategory $(A\to B, I)$ where $I$ is a $B$-module, so it is equivalent to $\text{B-Mod}$. Hence, the image of $\underline{\text{Exal}}_A(B,I)$ under the functor $\pi$ lives in $\text{B-Mod}$.

The isomorphism classes of objects has the structure of a $B$-module since $\underline{\text{Exal}}_A(B,I)$ is a Picard stack, so the category can be turned into a module $\text{Exal}_A(B,I)$.

== Structure of Exal_{A}(B, I) ==
There are a few results on the structure of $\underline{\text{Exal}}_A(B,I)$ and $\text{Exal}_A(B,I)$ which are useful.

=== Automorphisms ===
The group of automorphisms of an object $X \in \text{Ob}(\underline{\text{Exal}}_A(B,I) )$ can be identified with the automorphisms of the trivial extension $B\oplus M$ (explicitly, we mean automorphisms $B\oplus M \to B\oplus M$ compatible with both the inclusion $M\to B \oplus M$ and projection $B\oplus M \to B$). These are classified by the derivations module $\text{Der}_A(B,M)$. Hence, the category $\underline{\text{Exal}}_A(B,I)$ is a torsor. In fact, this could also be interpreted as a Gerbe since this is a group acting on a stack.

=== Composition of extensions ===
There is another useful result about the categories $\underline{\text{Exal}}_A(B,-)$ describing the extensions of $I\oplus J$, there is an isomorphism

$\underline{\text{Exal}}_A(B,I\oplus J) \cong \underline{\text{Exal}}_A(B,I)\times \underline{\text{Exal}}_A(B,J)$

It can be interpreted as saying the square-zero extension from a deformation in two directions can be decomposed into a pair of square-zero extensions, each in the direction of one of the deformations.

==== Application ====
For example, the deformations given by infinitesimals $\varepsilon_1,\varepsilon_2$ where $\varepsilon_1^2 = \varepsilon_1\varepsilon_2 = \varepsilon_2^2 = 0$ gives the isomorphism

$\underline{\text{Exal}}_A(B,(\varepsilon_1) \oplus (\varepsilon_2)) \cong \underline{\text{Exal}}_A(B,(\varepsilon_1))\times \underline{\text{Exal}}_A(B,(\varepsilon_2))$

where $I$ is the module of these two infinitesimals. In particular, when relating this to Kodaira-Spencer theory, and using the comparison with the cotangent complex (given below) this means all such deformations are classified by

$H^1(X,T_X)\times H^1(X,T_X)$

hence they are just a pair of first order deformations paired together.

== Relation with the cotangent complex ==
The cotangent complex contains all of the information about a deformation problem, and it is a fundamental theorem that given a morphism of rings $A \to B$ over a topos $T$ (note taking $T$ as the point topos shows this generalizes the construction for general rings), there is a functorial isomorphism

$\text{Exal}_A(B,M) \xrightarrow{\simeq} \text{Ext}_B^1(\mathbf{L}_{B/A}, M)$^{(theorem III.1.2.3)}

So, given a commutative square of ring morphisms

$$\begin{matrix}
A' & \to & B' \\
\downarrow & & \downarrow \\
A & \to & B
\end{matrix}$$

over $T$ there is a square

$$\begin{matrix}
\text{Exal}_A(B,M) & \to & \text{Ext}^1_B(\mathbf{L}_{B/A}, M) \\
\downarrow & & \downarrow \\
\text{Exal}_{A'}(B',M) & \to & \text{Ext}^1_{B'}(\mathbf{L}_{B'/A'}, M)
\end{matrix}$$

whose horizontal arrows are isomorphisms and $M$ has the structure of a $B'$-module from the ring morphism.

== See also ==
- Deformation theory
- Cotangent complex
- Picard stack
