= André–Quillen cohomology =

Theory of cohomology for commutative rings

In commutative algebra and algebraic geometry, André–Quillen cohomology is a cohomology theory for commutative rings and their modules, constructed using the cotangent complex. It provides a derived generalization of the module of derivations and describes infinitesimal deformations, extensions, and obstructions of commutative algebras. The theory was developed independently by Michel André and Daniel Quillen using methods from homological algebra and homotopy theory. Its low-degree groups are related to the Lichtenbaum–Schlessinger functors introduced by Stephen Lichtenbaum and Michael Schlessinger in 1967. André–Quillen cohomology is accompanied by a corresponding homology theory, known as André–Quillen homology. Both theories arise from the cotangent complex and extend the classical theory of Kähler differentials.

== Motivation ==
Let $A$ be a commutative ring, let $B$ be a commutative $A$-algebra, and let $M$ be a $B$-module.

An $A$-linear derivation is an additive map

$$\delta:B\longrightarrow M$$

satisfying the Leibniz rule

$$\delta(bb')
=
b\delta(b')+b'\delta(b)$$

for all $b,b'\in B$, and satisfying $\delta(a)=0$ for the image of every $a\in A$.

The set of such derivations forms a $B$-module, denoted

$$\operatorname{Der}_A(B,M).$$

The module of Kähler differentials $\Omega_{B/A}$ represents the derivation functor. More precisely, there is a natural isomorphism

$$\operatorname{Der}_A(B,M)
\cong
\operatorname{Hom}_B(\Omega_{B/A},M).$$

This isomorphism follows from the universal property of Kähler differentials.

Although the module of Kähler differentials describes first-order differential behavior, it does not retain all the homological information associated with singularities, non-flat morphisms, or infinitesimal extensions.

The cotangent complex replaces $\Omega_{B/A}$ with an object of the derived category of $B$-modules.

André–Quillen cohomology is obtained by applying derived Hom to this complex.

== Derivations and Kähler differentials ==
=== Universal derivation ===
Let $B$ be an $A$-algebra.

The module of Kähler differentials $\Omega_{B/A}$ is generated by formal symbols $db$, for $b\in B$, subject to the relations

$$d(b+b')=db+db',$$

$$d(bb')=b\,db'+b'\,db,$$

and

$$da=0$$

for elements $a$ in the image of $A$.

The universal derivation is

$$d_{B/A}:B\longrightarrow\Omega_{B/A}.$$

Every $A$-linear derivation $\delta:B\to M$ factors uniquely through $d_{B/A}$.

Thus there exists a unique $B$-linear map

$$\varphi:\Omega_{B/A}\longrightarrow M$$

such that

$$\delta=\varphi\circ d_{B/A}.$$

This universal property may be represented by the commutative diagram

$$\begin{array}{ccc}
B&\xrightarrow{\ d_{B/A}\ }&\Omega_{B/A}\\
&\searrow\delta&\downarrow\varphi\\
&&M.
\end{array}$$

=== Exact sequence of differentials ===
Suppose that

$$A\longrightarrow B\longrightarrow C$$

is a sequence of homomorphisms of commutative rings.

There is a natural right-exact sequence

$$C\otimes_B\Omega_{B/A}
\longrightarrow
\Omega_{C/A}
\longrightarrow
\Omega_{C/B}
\longrightarrow0.$$

The first homomorphism is induced by the derivation

$$b\longmapsto d_{C/A}(b),$$

while the second is induced by the universal property of $\Omega_{C/B}$.

Applying $\operatorname{Hom}_C(-,M)$ gives the left-exact sequence

$$0\longrightarrow
\operatorname{Der}_B(C,M)
\longrightarrow
\operatorname{Der}_A(C,M)
\longrightarrow
\operatorname{Der}_A(B,M).$$

The last map restricts a derivation on $C$ to the image of $B$.

André–Quillen cohomology extends this relationship to a long exact sequence containing higher cohomology groups.

== The cotangent complex ==
Let $A\to B$ be a homomorphism of commutative rings.

Choose a simplicial resolution

$$P_\bullet\longrightarrow B$$

by free commutative $A$-algebras, or more generally a cofibrant simplicial $A$-algebra resolution.

For each simplicial degree $n$, form the module of Kähler differentials

$$\Omega_{P_n/A}.$$

These modules assemble into a simplicial $P_\bullet$-module

$$\Omega_{P_\bullet/A}.$$

After extending scalars to $B$, one obtains

$$B\otimes_{P_\bullet}\Omega_{P_\bullet/A}.$$

Applying the normalized chain complex construction gives a chain complex of $B$-modules.

The relative cotangent complex is represented by

$$L_{B/A}
=
N\left(
B\otimes_{P_\bullet}\Omega_{P_\bullet/A}
\right).$$

Here $N$ denotes the normalized chain complex of a simplicial module.

The resulting object is independent, up to canonical isomorphism in the derived category, of the chosen cofibrant resolution.

Thus

$$L_{B/A}\in D(B),$$

where $D(B)$ is the derived category of $B$-modules.

The cotangent complex is naturally connective when expressed in homological grading.

Its zeroth homology is the module of Kähler differentials:

$$H_0(L_{B/A})\cong\Omega_{B/A}.$$

Higher homology groups measure information that is not detected by ordinary Kähler differentials.

== Definition of André–Quillen cohomology ==
Let $A\to B$ be a homomorphism of commutative rings, and let $M$ be a $B$-module.

For every integer $n\geq0$, the André–Quillen cohomology group of $B$ over $A$ with coefficients in $M$ is

$$D^n(B/A,M)
=
H^n\left(
\mathbf{R}\operatorname{Hom}_B(L_{B/A},M)
\right).$$

Equivalently,

$$D^n(B/A,M)
=
\operatorname{Ext}_B^n(L_{B/A},M),$$

where Ext is interpreted in the derived category, with the cotangent complex as its first argument.

The zeroth cohomology group recovers the ordinary derivation module:

$$D^0(B/A,M)
\cong
\operatorname{Der}_A(B,M).$$

In particular,

$$D^0(B/A,M)
\cong
\operatorname{Hom}_B(\Omega_{B/A},M).$$

The first cohomology group classifies equivalence classes of square-zero extensions of $B$ by $M$ as commutative $A$-algebras.

The second cohomology group is associated with obstruction classes in infinitesimal deformation problems.

Higher groups encode additional derived deformation information.

== André–Quillen homology ==
The corresponding André–Quillen homology groups are defined by

$$D_n(B/A,M)
=
H_n\left(
L_{B/A}\otimes_B^{\mathbf L}M
\right).$$

Here $\otimes_B^{\mathbf L}$ denotes the derived tensor product.

For $n=0$,

$$D_0(B/A,M)
\cong
\Omega_{B/A}\otimes_B M.$$

In particular,

$$D_0(B/A,B)
\cong
\Omega_{B/A}.$$

The homology and cohomology constructions can be represented schematically as

$$\begin{array}{ccccc}
&&L_{B/A}&&\\
&\swarrow&&\searrow&\\
L_{B/A}\otimes_B^{\mathbf L}M
&&&&
\mathbf{R}\operatorname{Hom}_B(L_{B/A},M)\\
\downarrow H_n&&&&\downarrow H^n\\
D_n(B/A,M)&&&&D^n(B/A,M).
\end{array}$$

The arrows in this diagram indicate the constructions applied to the cotangent complex, rather than morphisms of complexes.

== The transitivity triangle ==
One of the fundamental properties of the cotangent complex is the transitivity triangle.

Let

$$A\longrightarrow B\longrightarrow C$$

be homomorphisms of commutative rings.

There is a distinguished triangle in $D(C)$:

$$C\otimes_B^{\mathbf L}L_{B/A}
\longrightarrow
L_{C/A}
\longrightarrow
L_{C/B}
\longrightarrow
\left(C\otimes_B^{\mathbf L}L_{B/A}\right)[1].$$

The triangle is a derived analogue of the exact sequence of Kähler differentials.

Its first three terms may be represented as

$$\begin{array}{ccc}
C\otimes_B^{\mathbf L}L_{B/A}
&\longrightarrow&
L_{C/A}\\
&&\downarrow\\
&&L_{C/B}.
\end{array}$$

The final morphism of the distinguished triangle is the connecting morphism into the shifted complex.

=== Long exact sequence in cohomology ===
Let $M$ be a $C$-module.

Applying the derived Hom functor

$$\mathbf{R}\operatorname{Hom}_C(-,M)$$

to the transitivity triangle produces a long exact sequence

$$\begin{aligned}
0&\longrightarrow D^0(C/B,M)\\
&\longrightarrow D^0(C/A,M)\\
&\longrightarrow D^0(B/A,M)\\
&\longrightarrow D^1(C/B,M)\\
&\longrightarrow D^1(C/A,M)\\
&\longrightarrow D^1(B/A,M)\\
&\longrightarrow D^2(C/B,M)
\longrightarrow\cdots.
\end{aligned}$$

In this sequence, $D^n(B/A,M)$ is computed using $M$ as a $B$-module through $B\to C$.

The first three terms recover the exact sequence of derivations.

The higher terms extend the classical Lichtenbaum–Schlessinger sequences.

=== Long exact sequence in homology ===
Applying derived tensor product with $M$ gives the corresponding long exact homology sequence

$$\begin{aligned}
\cdots\longrightarrow
&D_n(B/A,M)\\
\longrightarrow\;&D_n(C/A,M)\\
\longrightarrow\;&D_n(C/B,M)\\
\longrightarrow\;&D_{n-1}(B/A,M)
\longrightarrow\cdots.
\end{aligned}$$

This sequence is a fundamental computational tool in André–Quillen homology.

== Square-zero extensions ==
Let $B$ be an $A$-algebra and let $M$ be a $B$-module.

A square-zero extension of $B$ by $M$ is an exact sequence of commutative $A$-algebras and modules

$$0\longrightarrow M
\longrightarrow E
\longrightarrow B
\longrightarrow0,$$

where the image of $M$ is an ideal satisfying

$$M^2=0.$$

The action of $E$ on $M$ factors through the quotient $B$, giving the specified $B$-module structure.

=== Classification theorem ===
Theorem. Equivalence classes of square-zero extensions of $B$ by $M$ as commutative $A$-algebras are naturally classified by

$$D^1(B/A,M).$$

The zero class corresponds to the split square-zero extension

$$B\oplus M,$$

whose multiplication is

$$(b,m)(b',m')
=
(bb',bm'+b'm).$$

The square-zero condition follows from

$$(0,m)(0,m')=(0,0).$$

The classification identifies the first André–Quillen cohomology group with the space of equivalence classes of infinitesimal algebra extensions.

== Infinitesimal deformation theory ==
André–Quillen cohomology is closely related to deformation theory.

Suppose that an $A$-algebra $B$ is to be lifted across a square-zero extension of base rings

$$0\longrightarrow I
\longrightarrow A'
\longrightarrow A
\longrightarrow0.$$

Under the usual deformation-theoretic hypotheses, an obstruction to the existence of a flat lifting is represented by a class in

$$D^2(B/A,B\otimes_A I).$$

When the obstruction vanishes and liftings exist, their equivalence classes form a torsor under an appropriate first André–Quillen cohomology group.

Infinitesimal automorphisms of a lifting are governed by degree-zero André–Quillen cohomology.

Thus the first three degrees have the following interpretations:

- $D^0$ describes derivations and infinitesimal automorphisms.
- $D^1$ describes square-zero extensions and first-order deformation classes.
- $D^2$ contains obstruction classes for suitable deformation problems.

These interpretations depend on the precise deformation problem and its hypotheses.

== Polynomial algebras ==
Let

$$B=A[x_1,\ldots,x_r]$$

be a polynomial algebra over $A$.

The module of Kähler differentials is free:

$$\Omega_{B/A}
\cong
\bigoplus_{i=1}^{r}B\,dx_i.$$

Because polynomial algebras are free commutative algebras, their relative cotangent complexes are concentrated in degree zero:

$$L_{B/A}\simeq\Omega_{B/A}[0].$$

Therefore

$$D^0(B/A,M)
\cong
\operatorname{Hom}_B(\Omega_{B/A},M)
\cong M^r.$$

Since $\Omega_{B/A}$ is a free $B$-module,

$$D^n(B/A,M)=0$$

for every $n>0$.

Similarly,

$$D_n(B/A,M)=0$$

for every $n>0$.

This illustrates the vanishing of higher André–Quillen groups for polynomial algebras.

== Smooth algebras ==
Suppose that $B$ is a smooth $A$-algebra.

Then the cotangent complex is quasi-isomorphic to the module of Kähler differentials concentrated in degree zero:

$$L_{B/A}\simeq\Omega_{B/A}[0].$$

Moreover, $\Omega_{B/A}$ is a finitely generated projective $B$-module when the morphism is smooth of finite presentation.

Consequently,

$$D^n(B/A,M)=0
\qquad(n>0)$$

and

$$D_n(B/A,M)=0
\qquad(n>0).$$

This vanishing expresses the infinitesimal lifting properties of smooth morphisms.

== Quotient algebras and the conormal sequence ==
Let $P$ be a polynomial algebra over $A$, and let

$$B=P/I$$

for an ideal $I\subseteq P$.

The conormal sequence is

$$I/I^2
\xrightarrow{\ d\ }
\Omega_{P/A}\otimes_P B
\longrightarrow
\Omega_{B/A}
\longrightarrow0.$$

The first map sends the class of $f\in I$ to the differential $df$.

When $I$ is generated by a regular sequence, the cotangent complex is represented by the two-term complex

$$L_{B/A}
\simeq
\left[
I/I^2
\xrightarrow{\ d\ }
\Omega_{P/A}\otimes_P B
\right],$$

where $I/I^2$ is placed in homological degree one and the module of differentials in degree zero.

The complex can be displayed as

$$\begin{array}{ccc}
I/I^2&\xrightarrow{\ d\ }&
\Omega_{P/A}\otimes_P B\\
\text{degree }1&&\text{degree }0.
\end{array}$$

This presentation makes it possible to calculate André–Quillen cohomology using ordinary homological algebra.

== Example: A singular hypersurface ==
Let $k$ be a field of characteristic different from two, and consider

$$B=k[x]/(x^2).$$

Write $P=k[x]$ and $I=(x^2)$.

Since $x^2$ is a non-zero-divisor in $P$, the ideal $I$ is generated by a regular sequence.

Therefore

$$L_{B/k}
\simeq
\left[
I/I^2
\longrightarrow
\Omega_{P/k}\otimes_P B
\right].$$

Both modules are free of rank one over $B$.

The differential is induced by

$$d(x^2)=2x\,dx.$$

Hence

$$L_{B/k}
\simeq
[B\xrightarrow{\ 2x\ }B],$$

with the left copy of $B$ in homological degree one.

Applying $\operatorname{Hom}_B(-,B)$ gives the cochain complex

$$B\xrightarrow{\ 2x\ }B.$$

Thus

$$D^0(B/k,B)
=
\ker(2x:B\to B).$$

Since the characteristic of $k$ is not two,

$$\ker(2x)=xB.$$

Therefore

$$D^0(B/k,B)\cong xB.$$

In degree one,

$$D^1(B/k,B)
=
B/(2xB)
\cong B/(x)
\cong k.$$

The complex has no terms in higher degrees, so

$$D^n(B/k,B)=0
\qquad(n\geq2).$$

The nonvanishing of $D^1(B/k,B)$ reflects the existence of nontrivial infinitesimal deformation classes for this singular algebra.

== Complete intersections ==
Let $A\to B$ be a local complete intersection morphism.

The relative cotangent complex has Tor-amplitude contained in homological degrees zero and one.

Consequently,

$$D_n(B/A,M)=0
\qquad(n\geq2)$$

for every $B$-module $M$.

When the cotangent complex is represented by a two-term complex of projective modules, one also has

$$D^n(B/A,M)=0
\qquad(n\geq2).$$

This vanishing is an important homological property of local complete intersection morphisms.

It distinguishes complete intersection singularities from more general singularities, for which higher André–Quillen homology may be nonzero.

== Base change ==
Consider a Cartesian square of commutative rings

$$\begin{array}{ccc}
A&\longrightarrow&B\\
\downarrow&&\downarrow\\
A'&\longrightarrow&B',
\end{array}$$

where

$$B'=B\otimes_A A'.$$

If the square is Tor-independent, for example if $A'$ is flat over $A$, there is a natural quasi-isomorphism

$$L_{B'/A'}
\simeq
L_{B/A}\otimes_B^{\mathbf L}B'.$$

This expresses the compatibility of the cotangent complex with derived base change.

It allows André–Quillen homology to be computed after suitable changes of the base ring.

For a $B'$-module $M$, the resulting homology comparison is

$$D_n(B'/A',M)
\cong
D_n(B/A,M),$$

where the right-hand side uses the restricted $B$-module structure and the stated Tor-independence hypothesis.

A corresponding derived adjunction gives the analogous comparison for André–Quillen cohomology.

== Relationship with algebraic geometry ==
The cotangent complex and André–Quillen cohomology extend from ring homomorphisms to morphisms of schemes.

For a morphism

$$f:X\longrightarrow S,$$

the relative cotangent complex is an object

$$L_{X/S}\in D(\mathcal O_X).$$

When $X$ and $S$ are affine,

$$X=\operatorname{Spec}B,
\qquad
S=\operatorname{Spec}A,$$

the sheaf-theoretic cotangent complex corresponds to $L_{B/A}$.

For a quasi-coherent $\mathcal O_X$-module $\mathcal M$, the derived groups

$$\operatorname{Ext}_{\mathcal O_X}^{n}
(L_{X/S},\mathcal M)$$

play a central role in deformation theory.

In suitable deformation problems, degree-zero groups describe infinitesimal automorphisms, degree-one groups describe deformation classes, and degree-two groups contain obstructions.

The cotangent complex is therefore a fundamental construction in the deformation theory of schemes and algebraic stacks.

== See also ==
- Cotangent complex
- Kähler differential
- Derived functor
- Ext functor
- Tor functor
- Deformation theory
- Simplicial commutative ring
- Complete intersection
- Homological algebra
- Derived algebraic geometry
