= Donald C. Spencer =

American mathematician

- Born: Donald Clayton Spencer; April 25, 1912; Boulder, Colorado, U.S.
- Died: December 23, 2001 (aged 89); Durango, Colorado, U.S.
- Education: University of Colorado at Boulder; Massachusetts Institute of Technology; Trinity College, Cambridge
- Known for: Spencer cohomology Kodaira–Spencer map Salem–Spencer set
- Awards: Bôcher Memorial Prize (1948); National Medal of Science (1989)
- Scientific career
- Workplaces: Princeton University
- Doctoral advisor: J. E. Littlewood and G. H. Hardy
- Doctoral students: Pierre Conner; Patrick X. Gallagher; Phillip Griffiths; Robert Hermann; Roger Horn; Louis Howard; Joseph J. Kohn; Suresh H. Moolgavkar; John McCarthy

Donald Clayton Spencer (April 25, 1912 – December 23, 2001) was an American mathematician, known for work on deformation theory of structures arising in differential geometry, and on several complex variables from the point of view of partial differential equations. He was born in Boulder, Colorado, and educated at the University of Colorado and MIT.

== Career ==
He wrote a Ph.D. in diophantine approximation under J. E. Littlewood and G. H. Hardy at the University of Cambridge, completed in 1939. He had positions at MIT and Stanford before his appointment in 1950 at Princeton University. There he was involved in a series of collaborative works with Kunihiko Kodaira on the deformation of complex structures, which had some influence on the theory of complex manifolds and algebraic geometry, and the conception of moduli spaces.

He also was led to formulate the d-bar Neumann problem, for the operator $\bar{\partial}$ (see complex differential form) in PDE theory, to extend Hodge theory and the n-dimensional Cauchy–Riemann equations to the non-compact case. This is used to show existence theorems for holomorphic functions.

He later worked on pseudogroups and their deformation theory, based on a fresh approach to overdetermined systems of PDEs (bypassing the Cartan–Kähler ideas based on differential forms by making an intensive use of jets). Formulated at the level of various chain complexes, this gives rise to what is now called Spencer cohomology, a subtle and difficult theory both of formal and of analytical structure. This is a kind of Koszul complex theory, taken up by numerous mathematicians during the 1960s. In particular a theory for Lie equations formulated by Malgrange emerged, giving a very broad formulation of the notion of integrability.

== Legacy ==
After his death, a mountain peak outside Silverton, Colorado was named in his honor.

== See also ==
- Kodaira–Spencer mapping
- Salem–Spencer set

== Publications ==
- Schaeffer, A. C.; Spencer, D. C. (1950), Coefficient Regions for Schlicht Functions, American Mathematical Society Colloquium Publications, Vol. 35, Providence, R.I.: American Mathematical Society, ISBN 978-0-8218-1035-4, MR 0037908
- Schiffer, M. M.; Spencer, D. C. (1955), Functionals of Finite Riemann Surfaces, Princeton University Press
- Nickerson, H. K.; Spencer, D. C.; Steenrod, N. E. (1959), Advanced Calculus, Princeton, N.J.: Van NostrandNickerson, H. K.; Spencer, D. C.; Steenrod, Norman Earl (2011). Dover reprint. ISBN 978-0-4864-8090-9; pbk
- Kumpera, A.; Spencer, D. C. (1972), Lie Equations: Volume I, General Theory, AM-73, Annals of Mathematics Studies, Princeton University Press, ISBN 978-0-6910-8111-3; pbk
- Kumpera, A.; Spencer, D. C. (1974), Systems of Linear Partial Differential Equations and Deformation of Pseudogroup Structures, Les Presses de l'Université de Montréal
