= Robert Hermann (mathematician) =

American mathematician and mathematical physicist (1931–2020)

Robert C. Hermann (April 28, 1931 – February 10, 2020) was an American mathematician and mathematical physicist. In the 1960s Hermann worked on elementary particle physics and quantum field theory, and published books which revealed the interconnections between vector bundles on Riemannian manifolds and gauge theory in physics, before these interconnections became "common knowledge" among physicists in the 1970s.

== Biography ==
Born in Brooklyn, Hermann studied in Paris and at Princeton University, where he attended lectures by Charles Ehresmann and where in 1955 under Donald Spencer he received his PhD with thesis The Differential geometry of homogeneous spaces. He was a Benjamin Peirce Instructor at Harvard University in 1957, and researcher at MIT Lincoln Laboratory 1959 to 61 when he lectured at University of California Berkeley. In 1962 he became an associate professor at Northwestern University and was raised to full professor. In 1967 he taught at University of California Santa Cruz until moving to Rutgers University (1970 to 75). Subsequently he did research primarily with financial support from the Ames Research Center of NASA. In the academic year 1969/1970 he was at the Institute for Advanced Study.

Following the French school of Élie Cartan, Hermann published numerous books on differential geometry and Lie group theory and their applications to differential equations, integrable systems, control theory, and physics. Most of these books were published in Brookline, Massachusetts by Math Sci Press, which he founded. Two series were published: a green series "Interdisciplinary Mathematics" and a blue series "Lie Groups: History, Frontiers and Applications".

It is a deeply regrettable fact that the flow of information back and forth between "modern" geometric and algebraic mathematics and classical applied mathematics has been so minimal, even though there is clearly a solid basis for such interaction. One of my overall motives in writing my series of books "Interdisciplinary Mathematics" was to facilitate this flow...[despite] high structural and mental barriers to such cross-fertilization.

The blue series considered history of differential geometry and Lie theory, and edited, with extensive new commentary, the work of Sophus Lie, Gregorio Ricci-Curbastro and Tullio Levi-Civita, Felix Klein's Vorlesungen über Mathematikgeschichte, Élie Cartan, Georges Valiron and the contributions to invariant theory by David Hilbert.

Robert Hermann died on February 10, 2020.

== Early works ==
- 1966: Lie Groups for Physicists, Benjamin
- 1968: Differential geometry and the calculus of variations, Academic Press, second edition, Brookline 1977
- 1969: Fourier analysis on groups and partial wave analysis, Benjamin
- 1970: Lie algebras and quantum mechanics, Benjamin
- 1970: Lectures in mathematical physics, Benjamin
- 1970: Vector Bundles in mathematical physics, Benjamin 1970
- 1973: Geometry, Physics and Systems, Dekker
- 1973: Differential geometric methods and ideas in physics and engineering, Rutgers University Press
- 1974: Physical Aspects of Lie group theory, Montreal, Presse Universitaire de Montreal

== Published by Math Sci Press, Brookline, Massachusetts ==
- 1973, 1977: Topics in the mathematics of quantum mechanics
- 1973: Algebraic topics in systems theory
- 1973: General algebraic ideas
- 1973: Topics in General Relativity
- 1973: Energy-Momentum Tensors
- 1973: Linear and tensor algebra
- 1974: Spinors, Clifford and Cayley Algebras
- 1974: Linear systems and introductory algebraic geometry
- 1974: Geometric structure theory of systems-control theory and physics
- 1975: Gauge fields and Cartan–Ehresmann Connections
- 1977: The geometry of non-linear differential equations, Bäcklund transformations, and solitons
- 1977: (with Clyde Martin): Algebro-geometric and Lie theoretic techniques in systems theory
- 1977: Toda lattices, cosymplectic manifolds, Bäcklund transformations, and kinks
- 1977: Quantum and fermion differential geometry
- 1978: (with contributions by Frank Estabrook, Hugo Wahlquist) Yang–Mills, Kaluza–Klein, and the Einstein program
- 1979: Cartanian geometry, nonlinear waves, and control theory, Brookline, 2 parts: Part A, Part B 1980 (Cartanian meant in the sense of Élie Cartan)
- 1979: "Kleinian mathematics from an advanced standpoint", appendices to Felix Klein (M. Ackerman translator) Development of Mathematics in the 19th Century ISBN 0-915692-28-7
- 1980: (with Norman Hurt) Quantum statistical mechanics and Lie group harmonic analysis
- 1984: Topics in the geometric theory of linear systems
- 1984: Topics in the geometric theory of integrable dynamical systems
- 1988: Topics in physical geometry
- 1991: Geometric computing science – first steps
- 1991: Geometric structures in nonlinear systems, Brookline 1991 (including hydrodynamics, deformation structures, with list of publications by Hermann to 1991)
- 1992: Constrained mechanics and Lie theory
- 1993: Lie–Cartan–Ehresmann Theory
- 1994: Lie-theoretic ordinary differential equations, numerical analysis, mechanics, and differential systems
- 1994: C–O–R generalized functions, current algebras and control
