= Clyde Martin (mathematician) =

American mathematician

Clyde Martin is an American mathematician and Professor of Statistics. He is best known for his work collaborating with scientists, engineers, and health care professionals developing applications of statistics.

== Biography ==
Martin received his B.A. in mathematics education from Emporia State University. He completed a M.S., and he received his Ph.D. in 1971 from the University of Wyoming. After receiving his Ph.D. in mathematics, Martin worked as a National Research Council Research Associate at NASA from 1971 to 1973 and later in '76 and '77. He was coauthor with Robert Hermann of Algebro-geometric and Lie theoretic Techniques in Systems Theory (1977).

Since 1983, Martin has been on the faculty of Texas Tech University, and is currently an emeritus professor. From 1991 to 2014, he held the Paul Whitfield Horn Professorship of Mathematics.

Martin is a Fellow of the Institute of Electrical and Electronics Engineers and the American Statistical Association. In 2012, he served as Jefferson Science Fellow in the Secretary's Office of Global Food Security at the United States Department of State.

Recently, Martin has focused his research on studying improvements in crop insurance for farmers in Sub Saharan Africa. He also serves on the Science Advisory Board of the United States Environmental Protection Agency.

Martin has an Erdos number of 3.
