= Ringed topos =

Topos-theoretic version of a ringed space

In mathematics, a ringed topos is a generalization of a ringed space; that is, the notion is obtained by replacing a "topological space" by a "topos". The notion of a ringed topos has applications to deformation theory in algebraic geometry (cf. cotangent complex) and the mathematical foundation of quantum mechanics. In the latter subject, a Bohr topos is a ringed topos that plays the role of a quantum phase space.

The definition of a topos-version of a "locally ringed space" is not straightforward, as the meaning of "local" in this context is not obvious. One can introduce the notion of a locally ringed topos by introducing a sort of geometric conditions of local rings (see SGA4, Exposé IV, Exercise 13.9), which is equivalent to saying that all the stalks of the structure ring object are local rings when there are enough points.

== Morphisms ==
A morphism $(T, \mathcal{O}_T) \to (T', \mathcal{O}_{T'})$ of ringed topoi is a pair consisting of a topos morphism $f: T \to T'$ and a ring homomorphism $\mathcal{O}_{T'} \to f_*\mathcal{O}_T$.

If one replaces a "topos" by an ∞-topos, then one gets the notion of a ringed ∞-topos.

== Examples ==
=== Ringed topos of a topological space ===
One of the key motivating examples of a ringed topos comes from topology. Consider the site $\text{Open}(X)$ of a topological space $X$, and the sheaf of continuous functions

$C^0_X: \text{Open}(X)^{op} \to \text{CRing}$

sending an object $U \in \text{Open}(X)$, an open subset of $X$, to the ring of continuous functions $C^0_X(U)$ on $U$. Then, the pair $(\text{Sh}(\text{Open}(X)),C^0_X)$ forms a ringed topos. Note this can be generalized to any ringed space $(X,\mathcal{O}_X)$ where

$\mathcal{O}_X : \text{Open}(X)^{op} \to \text{Rings}$

so the pair $(\text{Sh}(\text{Open}(X)),\mathcal{O}_X)$ is a ringed topos.

=== Ringed topos of a scheme ===
Another key example is the ringed topos associated to a scheme $(X,\mathcal{O}_X)$, which is again the ringed topos associated to the underlying locally ringed space.

==== Relation with functor of points ====
Recall that the functor of points view of scheme theory defines a scheme $X$ as a functor $X:\text{CAlg} \to \text{Sets}$ which satisfies a sheaf condition and gluing condition. That is, for any open cover $\text{Spec}(R_{f_i}) \to \text{Spec}(R)$ of affine schemes, there is the following exact sequence

$X(R) \to \prod X(R_{f_i}) \rightrightarrows \prod X(R_{f_if_j})$

Also, there must exist open affine subfunctors

$U_i = \text{Spec}(A_i) = \text{Hom}_{\text{CAlg}}(A_i,-)$

covering $X$, meaning for any $\xi \in X(R)$, there is a $\xi|_{U_i} \in U_i(R)$. Then, there is a topos associated to $X$ whose underlying site is the site of open subfunctors. This site is isomorphic to the site associated to the underlying topological space of the ringed space corresponding to the scheme. Then, topos theory gives a way to construct scheme theory without having to use locally ringed spaces using the associated locally ringed topos.

=== Ringed topos of sets ===
The category of sets is equivalent to the category of sheaves on the category with one object and only the identity morphism, so $\text{Sh}(*) \cong \text{Sets}$. Then, given any ring $A$, there is an associated sheaf $\text{Hom}_{Sets}(-, A): \text{Sets}^{op} \to \text{Rings}$. This can be used to find toy examples of morphisms of ringed topoi.
