= Spencer cohomology =

In mathematics, Spencer cohomology is cohomology of a manifold with coefficients in the sheaf of solutions of a linear partial differential operator. It was introduced by Donald C. Spencer in 1969.

With origin in the geometry of partial differential equations, Spencer cohomology is best characterized in certain algebraic and categorial framework
