= Michael Schlessinger =

American mathematician

Michael Schlessinger (1937-2025) was a Professor Emeritus of Mathematics at the University of North Carolina at Chapel Hill who worked in algebraic geometry.

== Career ==
Schlessinger obtained his Ph.D. in 1964 from Harvard University, under the supervision of John Tate.

He proved Schlessinger's theorem about representable functors of Artinian algebras and introduced Lichtenbaum–Schlessinger functors in deformation theory.

In 2012 he became a fellow of the American Mathematical Society.
