= Suresh H. Moolgavkar =

Indian epidemiologist and mathematician

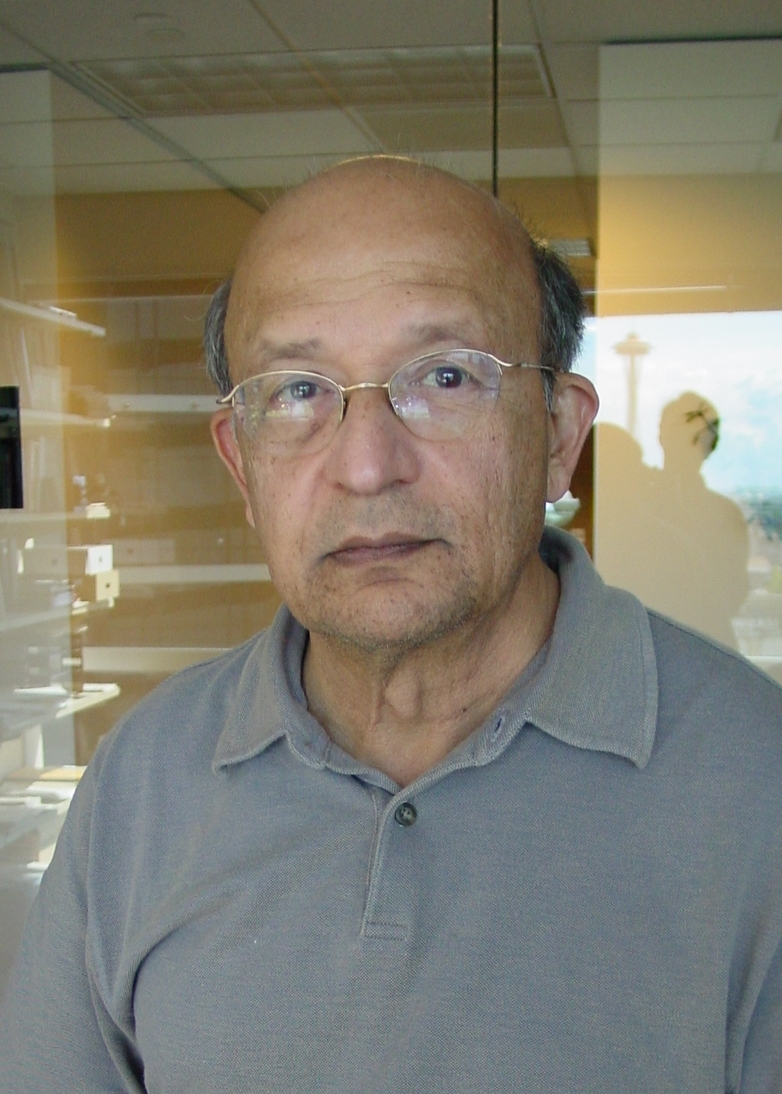
- Born: 3 January 1943 (age 83); Bombay, India
- Education: Johns Hopkins University
- Known for: Two-stage Clonal Expansion (TSCE) Model of Carcinogenesis
- Scientific career
- Fields: Epidemiology, Mathematics
- Workplaces: University of Washington, Fred Hutchinson Cancer Research Center

Suresh H. Moolgavkar (born 3 January 1943) is an Indian mathematician and epidemiologist who was at the University of Washington and the Fred Hutchinson Cancer Research Center in Seattle. He is a Senior Fellow and Research Scientist at Exponent, a consulting firm. Among his many scientific contributions is the development of the two-stage clonal expansion (TSCE) model of carcinogenesis, also known as the Moolgavkar-Venzon-Knudson (MVK) model, a stochastic cell-level description of carcinogenesis based on Alfred G. Knudson’s two-hit hypothesis. In its original development the TSCE model represents tumor initiation as the first hit, followed by cell proliferation (clonal expansion) and malignant transformation as the second hit. It has been interpreted as describing the initiation-promotion-progression sequence observed in chemical carcinogenesis and has been applied widely for the analysis of both experimental and epidemiological data for purposes of quantitative risk assessment.
