= Galina Tyurina =

Russian mathematician

Galina Nikolayevna Tyurina
- Галина Николаевна Тюрина
- Education: Moscow State University
- Scientific career
- Fields: Algebraic Geometry

Galina Nikolaevna Tyurina (July 19, 1938 – July 21, 1970) was a Soviet mathematician specializing in algebraic geometry. Despite dying young, she was known for "a series of brilliant papers" on the classification of complex or algebraic structures on topological spaces, on K3 surfaces, on singular points of algebraic varieties, and on the rigidity of complex structures. She was the only woman among a group of "exceptionally brilliant" Soviet mathematicians who became active in the 1960s and "quickly became the leaders and the driving forces of Soviet mathematics".

== Education ==
Tyurina was a 1960 graduate of Moscow State University, and completed her Ph.D. there in 1963 under the supervision of Igor Shafarevich.

== Personal life ==
Tyurina was "quiet and personally modest, but at the same time tough and self-confident". As well as for her work in mathematics, she was known as an accomplished outdoorswoman, the frequent leader of hiking, climbing, skiing, and kayaking excursions in the Russian wilderness. She drowned on one such trip in a kayaking accident in the Polar Urals, two days after her 32nd birthday.

Tyurina's younger brother Andrej Nikolaevich Tyurin also became a mathematician and a student of Shafarevich.
