= Schlessinger's theorem =

In algebra, Schlessinger's theorem is a theorem in deformation theory introduced by Schlessinger (1968) that gives conditions for a functor of artinian local rings to be pro-representable, refining an earlier theorem of Grothendieck.

== Definitions ==
Λ is a complete Noetherian local ring with residue field k, and C is the category of local Artinian Λ-algebras (meaning in particular that as modules over Λ they are finitely generated and Artinian) with residue field k.

A small extension in C is a morphism Y→Z in C that is surjective with kernel a 1-dimensional vector space over k.

A functor is called representable if it is of the form h_{X} where h_{X}(Y)=hom(X,Y) for some X, and is called pro-representable if it is of the form Y→lim hom(X_{i},Y) for a filtered direct limit over i in some filtered ordered set.

A morphism of functors F→G from C to sets is called smooth if whenever Y→Z is an epimorphism of C, the map from F(Y) to F(Z)×_{G(Z)}G(Y) is surjective. This definition is closely related to the notion of a formally smooth morphism of schemes. If in addition the map between the tangent spaces of F and G is an isomorphism, then F is called a hull of G.

== Grothendieck's theorem ==
Grothendieck (1960, proposition 3.1) showed that a functor from the category C of Artinian algebras to sets is pro-representable if and only if it preserves all finite limits. This condition is equivalent to asking that the functor preserves pullbacks and the final object. In fact Grothendieck's theorem applies not only to the category C of Artinian algebras, but to any category with finite limits whose objects are Artinian.

By taking the projective limit of the pro-representable functor in the larger category of linearly topologized local rings, one obtains a complete linearly topologized local ring representing the functor.

== Schlessinger's representation theorem ==
One difficulty in applying Grothendieck's theorem is that it can be hard to check that a functor preserves all pullbacks. Schlessinger showed that it is sufficient to check that the functor preserves pullbacks of a special form, which is often easier to check. Schlessinger's theorem also gives conditions under which the functor has a hull, even if it is not representable.

Schessinger's theorem gives conditions for a set-valued functor F on C to be representable by a complete local Λ-algebra R with maximal ideal m such that R/m^{n} is in C for all n.

Schlessinger's theorem states that a functor from C to sets with F(k) a 1-element set is representable by a complete Noetherian local algebra if it has the following properties, and has a hull if it has the first three properties:

- H1: The map F(Y×_{X}Z)→F(Y)×_{F(X)}F(Z) is surjective whenever Z→X is a small extension in C and Y→X is some morphism in C.
- H2: The map in H1 is a bijection whenever Z→X is the small extension k[x]/(x^{2})→k.
- H3: The tangent space of F is a finite-dimensional vector space over k.
- H4: The map in H1 is a bijection whenever Y=Z is a small extension of X and the maps from Y and Z to X are the same.

== See also ==
- Formal moduli
- Artin's criterion
