= Stephen Lichtenbaum =

American mathematician

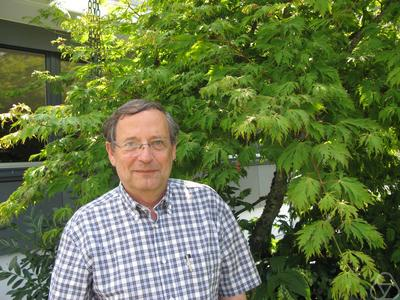
- Born: 1939 (age 86–87); Brooklyn
- Education: Harvard University
- Scientific career
- Fields: Mathematics
- Workplaces: Brown University
- Doctoral advisor: John Tate

Stephen Lichtenbaum (born 1939) is an American mathematician who is working in the fields of algebraic geometry, algebraic number theory and algebraic K-theory.

Lichtenbaum was an undergraduate at Harvard University (bachelor's degree "summa cum laude" in 1960), where he also obtained his Ph.D. in 1964 (Curves over discrete valuation rings, American Journal of Mathematics Bd.90, 1968, S.380-405). After that, he was a lecturer at the Princeton University. He was assistant professor at Cornell University, where he became associate professor in 1969 and professor in 1973. From 1979 to 1982 he was a member of the Faculty Board. Since 1990 he is professor at Brown University, where he was chairman from 1994 to 1997. He was also a visiting scientist at Institute for Advanced Study (1973, 1984), University of Paris (VI, XI, VII, XIII), IHES (1974, 1977, 1982 / 83, 1987/88, 1997), MSRI (1987), Isaac Newton Institute (1998, 2002). Since 2003, he has been an associate professor at the University of Paris Chevalaret.

The Quillen-Lichtenbaum conjecture (from about 1971) about the relationship of the values of the Dedekind zeta function of number fields at specific locations (negative integers) is named after him and Daniel Quillen.

In 1959 he was a Putnam Fellow. In 1973/74 he was a Guggenheim Fellow. Since 1995 he has been co-editor of Documenta Mathematica. In 2012 he became a fellow of the American Mathematical Society.
