= Deformation (mathematics) =

Branch of mathematics

In mathematics, deformation theory is the study of infinitesimal conditions associated with varying a solution P of a problem to slightly different solutions P_{ε}, where ε is a small number, or a vector of small quantities. The infinitesimal conditions are the result of applying the approach of differential calculus to solving a problem with constraints. The name is an analogy to non-rigid structures that deform slightly to accommodate external forces.

Some characteristic phenomena are: the derivation of first-order equations by treating the ε quantities as having negligible squares; the possibility of isolated solutions, in that varying a solution may not be possible, or does not bring anything new; and the question of whether the infinitesimal constraints actually 'integrate', so that their solution does provide small variations. In some form, these considerations have a history of centuries in mathematics, but also in physics and engineering. For example, in the geometry of numbers a class of results called isolation theorems was recognised, with the topological interpretation of an open orbit (of a group action) around a given solution. Perturbation theory also looks at deformations, in general of operators.

== Deformations of complex manifolds ==
The most salient deformation theory in mathematics has been that of complex manifolds and algebraic varieties. This was put on a firm basis by foundational work of Kunihiko Kodaira and Donald C. Spencer, after deformation techniques had received a great deal of more tentative application in the Italian school of algebraic geometry. One expects, intuitively, that deformation theory of the first order should equate the Zariski tangent space with a moduli space. The phenomena turn out to be rather subtle, though, in the general case.

In the case of Riemann surfaces, one can explain that the complex structure on the Riemann sphere is isolated (no moduli). For genus 1, an elliptic curve has a one-parameter family of complex structures, as shown in elliptic function theory. The general Kodaira–Spencer theory identifies as the key to the deformation theory the sheaf cohomology group

$$H^1(\Theta) \,$$

where Θ is (the sheaf of germs of sections of) the holomorphic tangent bundle. There is an obstruction in the H^{2} of the same sheaf; which is always zero in case of a curve, for general reasons of dimension. In the case of genus 0 the H^{1} vanishes, also. For genus 1 the dimension is the Hodge number h^{1,0} which is therefore 1. It is known that all curves of genus one have equations of form y^{2} = x^{3} + ax + b. These obviously depend on two parameters, a and b, whereas the isomorphism classes of such curves have only one parameter. Hence there must be an equation relating those a and b which describe isomorphic elliptic curves. It turns out that curves for which b^{2}a^{−3} has the same value, describe isomorphic curves. I.e. varying a and b is one way to deform the structure of the curve y^{2} = x^{3} + ax + b, but not all variations of a,b actually change the isomorphism class of the curve.

One can go further with the case of genus g > 1, using Serre duality to relate the H^{1} to

$$H^0(\Omega^{[2]})$$

where Ω is the holomorphic cotangent bundle and the notation Ω^{[2]} means the tensor square (not the second exterior power). In other words, deformations are regulated by holomorphic quadratic differentials on a Riemann surface, again something known classically. The dimension of the moduli space, called Teichmüller space in this case, is computed as 3g − 3, by the Riemann–Roch theorem.

These examples are the beginning of a theory applying to holomorphic families of complex manifolds, of any dimension. Further developments included: the extension by Spencer of the techniques to other structures of differential geometry; the assimilation of the Kodaira–Spencer theory into the abstract algebraic geometry of Grothendieck, with a consequent substantive clarification of earlier work; and deformation theory of other structures, such as algebras.

== Deformations and flat maps ==
The most general form of a deformation is a flat map $f:X \to S$ of complex-analytic spaces, schemes, or germs of functions on a space. Grothendieck was the first to find this far-reaching generalization for deformations and developed the theory in that context. The general idea is there should exist a universal family $\mathfrak{X} \to B$ such that any deformation can be found as a unique pullback square

$$\begin{matrix}
X & \to & \mathfrak{X} \\
\downarrow & & \downarrow \\
S & \to & B
\end{matrix}$$

In many cases, this universal family is either a Hilbert scheme or Quot scheme, or a quotient of one of them. For example, in the construction of the moduli of curves, it is constructed as a quotient of the smooth curves in the Hilbert scheme. If the pullback square is not unique, then the family is only versal.

== Deformations of germs of analytic algebras ==
One of the useful and readily computable areas of deformation theory comes from the deformation theory of germs of complex spaces, such as Stein manifolds, complex manifolds, or complex analytic varieties. Note that this theory can be globalized to complex manifolds and complex analytic spaces by considering the sheaves of germs of holomorphic functions, tangent spaces, etc. Such algebras are of the form

$A \cong \frac{\mathbb{C}\{z_1,\ldots, z_n\}}{I}$

where $\mathbb{C}\{z_1,\ldots,z_n \}$ is the ring of convergent power-series and $I$ is an ideal. For example, many authors study the germs of functions of a singularity, such as the algebra

$A \cong \frac{\mathbb{C}\{x,y\}}{(y^2 - x^n)}$

representing a plane-curve singularity. A germ of analytic algebras is then an object in the opposite category of such algebras. Then, a deformation of a germ of analytic algebras $X_0$ is given by a flat map of germs of analytic algebras $f:X \to S$ where $S$ has a distinguished point $0$ such that the $X_0$ fits into the pullback square

$$\begin{matrix}
X_0 & \to & X \\
\downarrow & & \downarrow \\
* & \xrightarrow[0]{} & S
\end{matrix}$$

These deformations have an equivalence relation given by commutative squares

$$\begin{matrix}
X'& \to & X \\
\downarrow & & \downarrow \\
S' & \to & S
\end{matrix}$$

where the horizontal arrows are isomorphisms. For example, there is a deformation of the plane curve singularity given by the opposite diagram of the commutative diagram of analytic algebras

$$\begin{matrix}
\frac{\mathbb {C} \{x,y\}}{(y^{2}-x^{n})} & \leftarrow & \frac{\mathbb {C} \{x,y, s\}}{(y^{2}-x^{n} + s)} \\
\uparrow & & \uparrow \\
\mathbb{C} & \leftarrow & \mathbb{C}\{s\}
\end{matrix}$$

In fact, Milnor studied such deformations, where a singularity is deformed by a constant, hence the fiber over a non-zero $s$ is called the Milnor fiber.

=== Cohomological Interpretation of deformations ===
It should be clear there could be many deformations of a single germ of analytic functions. Because of this, there are some book-keeping devices required to organize all of this information. These organizational devices are constructed using tangent cohomology. This is formed by using the Koszul–Tate resolution, and potentially modifying it by adding additional generators for non-regular algebras $A$. In the case of analytic algebras these resolutions are called the Tjurina resolution for the mathematician who first studied such objects, Galina Tyurina. This is a graded-commutative differential graded algebra $(R_\bullet, s)$ such that $R_0 \to A$ is a surjective map of analytic algebras, and this map fits into an exact sequence

$\cdots \xrightarrow{s} R_{-2} \xrightarrow{s} R_{-1} \xrightarrow{s} R_0 \xrightarrow{p} A \to 0$

Then, by taking the differential graded module of derivations $(\text{Der}(R_\bullet), d)$, its cohomology forms the tangent cohomology of the germ of analytic algebras $A$. These cohomology groups are denoted $T^k(A)$. The $T^1(A)$ contains information about all of the deformations of $A$ and can be readily computed using the exact sequence

$0 \to T^0(A) \to \text{Der}(R_0) \xrightarrow{d} \text{Hom}_{R_0}(I,A) \to T^1(A) \to 0$

If $A$ is isomorphic to the algebra

$\frac{\mathbb{C}\{z_1,\ldots,z_n\}}{(f_1,\ldots, f_m)}$

then its deformations are equal to

$T^1(A) \cong \frac{A^m}{df \cdot A^n}$

were $df$ is the jacobian matrix of $f = (f_1,\ldots, f_m): \mathbb{C}^n \to \mathbb{C}^m$. For example, a hypersurface given by $f$ has the deformations

$T^1(A) \cong \frac{A^n}{\left( \frac{\partial f}{\partial z_1}, \ldots, \frac{\partial f}{\partial z_n} \right)}$

In the case of the plane-curve singularity $y^2 - x^3$, this is the module

$\frac{A^2}{(y, x^2)}$

hence the only deformations are given by adding constants or linear factors, so a general deformation of $f(x,y) = y^2 - x^3$ is $F(x,y,a_1,a_2) = y^2 - x^3 + a_1 + a_2x$ where the $a_i$ are deformation parameters.

== Functorial description ==
Another method for formalizing deformation theory is using functors on the category $\text{Art}_k$ of local Artin algebras over a field. A pre-deformation functor is defined as a functor

$$F: \text{Art}_k \to \text{Sets}$$

such that $F(k)$ is a point. The idea is that we want to study the infinitesimal structure of some moduli space around a point where lying above that point is the space of interest. It is typically the case that it is easier to describe the functor for a moduli problem instead of finding an actual space. For example, if we want to consider the moduli-space of hypersurfaces of degree $d$ in $\mathbb{P}^n$, then we could consider the functor

$$F: \text{Sch} \to \text{Sets}$$

where

$$F(S) = \left\{
\begin{matrix}
X \\
\downarrow \\
S
\end{matrix}
: \text{ each fiber is a degree } d \text{ hypersurface in }\mathbb{P}^n\right\}$$

Although in general, it is more convenient/required to work with functors of groupoids instead of sets. This is true for moduli of curves.

=== Technical remarks about infinitesimals ===
Infinitesimals have long been in use by mathematicians for non-rigorous arguments in calculus. The idea is that if we consider polynomials $F(x,\varepsilon)$ with an infinitesimal $\varepsilon$, then only the first order terms really matter; that is, we can consider

$$F(x,\varepsilon) \equiv f(x) + \varepsilon g(x) + O(\varepsilon^2)$$

A simple application of this is that we can find the derivatives of monomials using infinitesimals:

$$(x+\varepsilon)^3 = x^3 + 3x^2\varepsilon + O(\varepsilon^2)$$

the $\varepsilon$ term contains the derivative of the monomial, demonstrating its use in calculus. We could also interpret this equation as the first two terms of the Taylor expansion of the monomial. Infinitesimals can be made rigorous using nilpotent elements in local artin algebras. In the ring $k[y]/(y^2)$ we see that arguments with infinitesimals can work. This motivates the notation $k[\varepsilon] = k[y]/(y^2)$, which is called the ring of dual numbers.

Moreover, if we want to consider higher-order terms of a Taylor approximation then we could consider the artin algebras $k[y]/(y^k)$. For our monomial, suppose we want to write out the second order expansion, then

$$(x+\varepsilon)^3 = x^3 + 3x^2\varepsilon + 3x\varepsilon^2 + \varepsilon^3$$

Recall that a Taylor expansion (at zero) can be written out as

$$f(x) = f(0) + \frac{f^{(1)}(0)}{1!}x + \frac{f^{(2)}(0)}{2!}x^2 + \frac{f^{(3)}(0)}{3!}x^3 + \cdots$$

hence the previous two equations show that the second derivative of $x^3$ is $6x$.

In general, since we want to consider arbitrary order Taylor expansions in any number of variables, we will consider the category of all local artin algebras over a field.

=== Motivation ===
To motivate the definition of a pre-deformation functor, consider the projective hypersurface over a field

$$\begin{matrix}
\operatorname{Proj}\left( \dfrac{\mathbb{C}[x_0,x_1,x_2,x_3]}{(x_0^4 + x_1^4 + x_2^4 + x_3^4)} \right) \\
\downarrow \\
\operatorname{Spec}(k)
\end{matrix}$$

If we want to consider an infinitesimal deformation of this space, then we could write down a Cartesian square

$$\begin{matrix}
\operatorname{Proj}\left( \dfrac{\mathbb{C}[x_0,x_1,x_2,x_3]}{(x_0^4 + x_1^4 + x_2^4 + x_3^4)} \right) & \to & \operatorname{Proj}\left( \dfrac{ \mathbb{C}[x_0,x_1,x_2,x_3][\varepsilon]}{(x_0^4 + x_1^4 + x_2^4 + x_3^4 + \varepsilon  x_0^{a_0} x_1^{a_1} x_2^{a_2} x_3^{a_3}) } \right) \\
\downarrow & & \downarrow\\
\operatorname{Spec}(k) & \to & \operatorname{Spec}(k[\varepsilon])
\end{matrix}$$

where $a_0 + a_1 + a_2 + a_3 = 4$. Then, the space on the right hand corner is one example of an infinitesimal deformation: the extra scheme theoretic structure of the nilpotent elements in $\operatorname{Spec}(k[\varepsilon])$ (which is topologically a point) allows us to organize this infinitesimal data. Since we want to consider all possible expansions, we will let our predeformation functor be defined on objects as

$$F(A) = \left\{
\begin{matrix}
\operatorname{Proj}\left( \dfrac{\mathbb{C}[x_0,x_1,x_2,x_3]}{(x_0^4 + x_1^4 + x_2^4 + x_3^4)} \right) & \to & \mathfrak{X} \\
\downarrow & & \downarrow \\
\operatorname{Spec}(k) & \to & \operatorname{Spec}(A)
\end{matrix}
\right\}$$

where $A$ is a local Artin $k$-algebra.

=== Smooth pre-deformation functors ===
A pre-deformation functor is called smooth if for any surjection $A' \to A$ such that the square of any element in the kernel is zero, there is a surjection

$$F(A') \to F(A)$$

This is motivated by the following question: given a deformation

$$\begin{matrix}
X & \to & \mathfrak{X} \\
\downarrow & & \downarrow \\
\operatorname{Spec}(k) & \to & \operatorname{Spec}(A)
\end{matrix}$$

does there exist an extension of this cartesian diagram to the cartesian diagrams

$$\begin{matrix}
X & \to & \mathfrak{X} & \to & \mathfrak{X}' \\
\downarrow & & \downarrow & & \downarrow \\
\operatorname{Spec}(k) & \to & \operatorname{Spec}(A) & \to & \operatorname{Spec}(A')
\end{matrix}$$

the name smooth comes from the lifting criterion of a smooth morphism of schemes.

=== Tangent space ===
Recall that the tangent space of a scheme $X$ can be described as the $\operatorname{Hom}$-set

$$TX := \operatorname{Hom}_{\text{Sch}/k}(\operatorname{Spec}(k[\varepsilon]),X)$$

where the source is the ring of dual numbers. Since we are considering the tangent space of a point of some moduli space, we can define the tangent space of our (pre-)deformation functor as

$$T_F := F(k[\varepsilon]).$$

== Applications of deformation theory ==
=== Dimension of moduli of curves ===
One of the first properties of the moduli of algebraic curves $\mathcal{M}_g$ can be deduced using elementary deformation theory. Its dimension can be computed as

$\dim(\mathcal{M}_g) = \dim H^1(C,T_C)$

for an arbitrary smooth curve of genus $g$ because the deformation space is the tangent space of the moduli space. Using Serre duality the tangent space is isomorphic to

$$\begin{align}
H^1(C,T_C) &\cong H^0(C,T_C^* \otimes \omega_C)^\vee \\
&\cong H^0(C,\omega_C^{\otimes 2})^\vee
\end{align}$$

Hence the Riemann–Roch theorem gives

$$\begin{align}
h^0(C,\omega_C^{\otimes 2}) - h^1(C,\omega_C^{\otimes 2}) &= 2(2g - 2) - g + 1 \\
&= 3g - 3
\end{align}$$

For curves of genus $g \geq 2$ the $h^1(C,\omega_C^{\otimes 2}) = 0$ because

$h^1(C,\omega_C^{\otimes 2}) = h^0(C, (\omega_C^{\otimes 2})^{\vee}\otimes \omega_C)$

the degree is

$$\begin{align}
\text{deg}((\omega_C^{\otimes 2})^\vee \otimes \omega_C) &= 4 - 4g + 2g - 2  \\
&= 2 - 2g
\end{align}$$

and $h^0(L) = 0$ for line bundles of negative degree. Therefore the dimension of the moduli space is $3g - 3$.

=== Bend-and-break ===
Deformation theory was famously applied in birational geometry by Shigefumi Mori to study the existence of rational curves on varieties. For a Fano variety of positive dimension Mori showed that there is a rational curve passing through every point. The method of the proof later became known as Mori's bend-and-break. The rough idea is to start with some curve C through a chosen point and keep deforming it until it breaks into several components. Replacing C by one of the components has the effect of decreasing either the genus or the degree of C. So after several repetitions of the procedure, eventually we'll obtain a curve of genus 0, i.e. a rational curve. The existence and the properties of deformations of C require arguments from deformation theory and a reduction to positive characteristic.

=== Arithmetic deformations ===
One of the major applications of deformation theory is in arithmetic. It can be used to answer the following question: if we have a variety $X/\mathbb{F}_p$, what are the possible extensions $\mathfrak{X}/\mathbb{Z}_p$? If our variety is a curve, then the vanishing $H^2$ implies that every deformation induces a variety over $\mathbb{Z}_p$; that is, if we have a smooth curve

$$\begin{matrix}
X \\
\downarrow \\
\operatorname{Spec}(\mathbb{F}_p)
\end{matrix}$$

and a deformation

$$\begin{matrix}
X & \to & \mathfrak{X}_2 \\
\downarrow & & \downarrow \\
\operatorname{Spec}(\mathbb{F}_p) & \to & \operatorname{Spec}(\mathbb{Z}/(p^2))
\end{matrix}$$

then we can always extend it to a diagram of the form

$$\begin{matrix}
X & \to & \mathfrak{X}_2 & \to & \mathfrak{X}_3 & \to \cdots \\
\downarrow & & \downarrow & & \downarrow &  \\
\operatorname{Spec}(\mathbb{F}_p) & \to & \operatorname{Spec}(\mathbb{Z}/(p^2)) & \to & \operatorname{Spec}(\mathbb{Z}/(p^3)) & \to \cdots
\end{matrix}$$

This implies that we can construct a formal scheme $\mathfrak{X} = \operatorname{Spet}(\mathfrak{X}_\bullet)$ giving a curve over $\mathbb{Z}_p$.

=== Deformations of abelian schemes ===
The Serre–Tate theorem asserts, roughly speaking, that the deformations of abelian scheme A is controlled by deformations of the p-divisible group $A[p^\infty]$ consisting of its p-power torsion points.

=== Galois deformations ===
Another application of deformation theory is with Galois deformations. It allows us to answer the question: If we have a Galois representation

$$G \to \operatorname{GL}_n(\mathbb{F}_p)$$

how can we extend it to a representation

$$G \to \operatorname{GL}_n(\mathbb{Z}_p) \text{?}$$

== Relationship to string theory ==
The so-called Deligne conjecture arising in the context of algebras (and Hochschild cohomology) stimulated much interest in deformation theory in relation to string theory (roughly speaking, to formalise the idea that a string theory can be regarded as a deformation of a point-particle theory). This is now accepted as proved, after some hitches with early announcements. Maxim Kontsevich is among those who have offered a generally accepted proof of this.

== See also ==
- Kodaira–Spencer map
- Dual number
- Schlessinger's theorem
- Exalcomm
- Cotangent complex
- Gromov–Witten invariant
- Moduli of algebraic curves
- Degeneration (algebraic geometry)

== Sources ==
- "deformation", Encyclopedia of Mathematics, EMS Press, 2001 [1994]
- Gerstenhaber, Murray and Stasheff, James, eds. (1992). Deformation Theory and Quantum Groups with Applications to Mathematical Physics, American Mathematical Society (Google eBook) ISBN 0821851411

=== Pedagogical ===
- Palamodov, V. P., III. Deformations of complex spaces. Complex Variables IV (very down to earth intro)
- Course Notes on Deformation Theory (Artin)
- Studying Deformation Theory of Schemes
- Sernesi, Eduardo, Deformations of Algebraic Schemes
- Hartshorne, Robin, Deformation Theory
- Notes from Hartshorne's Course on Deformation Theory
- MSRI – Deformation Theory and Moduli in Algebraic Geometry

=== Survey articles ===
- Mazur, Barry (2004), "Perturbations, Deformations, and Variations (and "Near-Misses" in Geometry, Physics, and Number Theory" (PDF), Bulletin of the American Mathematical Society, 41 (3): 307–336, doi:10.1090/S0273-0979-04-01024-9, MR 2058289
- Anel, M., Why deformations are cohomological (PDF)
