= Torsor (algebraic geometry) =

Algebraic geometry analog of a principal bundle in algebraic topology

In algebraic geometry, a torsor or a principal bundle is an analogue of a principal bundle in algebraic topology. Because there are few open sets in Zariski topology, it is more common to consider torsors in étale topology or some other flat topologies. The notion also generalizes a Galois extension in abstract algebra. Though other notions of torsors are known in more general context (e.g. over stacks) this article will focus on torsors over schemes, the original setting where torsors have been thought for. The word torsor comes from the French torseur. They are indeed widely discussed, for instance, in Michel Demazure's and Pierre Gabriel's famous book Groupes algébriques, Tome I.

== Definition ==
Let $\mathcal{T}$ be a Grothendieck topology and $X$ a scheme. Moreover let $G$ be a group scheme over $X$, a $G$-torsor (or principal $G$-bundle) over $X$ for the topology $\mathcal{T}$ (or simply a $G$-torsor when the topology is clear from the context) is the data of a scheme $P$ and a morphism $f:P\to X$ with a $G$-invariant (right) action on $P$ that is locally trivial in $\mathcal{T}$ i.e. there exists a covering $\{ U_i \to X \}$ such that the base change $U_i \times_X P$ over $P$ is isomorphic to the trivial torsor $U_i \times G \to U_i$

== Notations ==
When $\mathcal{T}$ is the étale topology (resp. fpqc, etc.) instead of a torsor for the étale topology we can also say an étale-torsor (resp. fpqc-torsor etc.).

== Étale, fpqc and fppf topologies ==
Unlike in the Zariski topology in many Grothendieck topologies a torsor can be itself a covering. This happens in some of the most common Grothendieck topologies, such as the fpqc-topology the fppf-topology but also the étale topology (and many less famous ones). So let $\mathcal{T}$ be any of those topologies (étale, fpqc, fppf). Let $X$ be a scheme and $G$ a group scheme over $X$. Then $P\to X$ is a $G$-torsor if and only if $P \times_X P$ over $P$ is isomorphic to the trivial torsor $P \times G$ over $P$. In this case we often say that a torsor trivializes itself (as it becomes a trivial torsor when pulled back over itself).

== Correspondence vector bundles-${GL}_n$-torsors ==
Over a given scheme $X$ there is a bijection, between vector bundles over $X$ (i.e. locally free sheaves) and ${GL}_n$-torsors, where $n=rk(V)\in \mathbb{N}$, the rank of $V$. Given $V$ one can take the (representable) sheaf of local isomorphisms $Isom(V,\mathcal{O}_X^{\oplus n})$ which has a structure of a $Isom(\mathcal{O}_X^{\oplus n},\mathcal{O}_X^{\oplus n})$-torsor. It is easy to prove that $Isom(\mathcal{O}_X^{\oplus n},\mathcal{O}_X^{\oplus n})\simeq GL_{n,X}$. We often refer to $Isom(V,\mathcal{O}_X^{\oplus n})$ as the frame bundle (or frame torsor) associated to $V$ and hence denote it as $Fr(V):=Isom(V,\mathcal{O}_X^{\oplus n})$.

== Trivial torsors and sections ==
A $G$-torsor $f:P\to X$ is isomorphic to a trivial torsor if and only if $P(X) = \operatorname{Mor}(X, P)$ is nonempty, i.e. the morphism $f$ admits at least a section $s:X\to P$. Indeed, if there exists a section $s: X \to P$, then $X \times G \to P, (x, g) \mapsto s(x)g$ is an isomorphism. On the other hand if $f:P\to X$ is isomorphic to a trivial $G$-torsor, then $P\simeq X\times G$; the identity lement $1_G\in G$ gives the required section $s=id_X\times 1_G$.

== Examples and basic properties ==
- If $L/K$ is a finite Galois extension, then $\operatorname{Spec} L \to \operatorname{Spec} K$ is a $\operatorname{Gal}(L/K)$-torsor (roughly because the Galois group acts simply transitively on the roots.) By abuse of notation we have still denoted by $\operatorname{Gal}(L/K)$ the finite constant group scheme over $K$ associated to the abstract group $\operatorname{Gal}(L/K)$. This fact is a basis for Galois descent. See integral extension for a generalization.
- If $X$ is an abelian variety over a field $k$ then the multiplication by $n\in \mathbb{N}$, $n_X:X\to X$ is a torsor for the fpqc-topology under the action of the finite $k$-group scheme $ker(n_X)$. That happens for instance when $X$ is an elliptic curve.
- An abelian torsor, a $G$-torsor where $G$ is an abelian variety.

== Torsors and cohomology ==
Let $P$ be a $G$-torsor for the étale topology and let $\{ U_i \to X \}$ be a covering trivializing $P$, as in the definition. A trivial torsor admits a section: thus, there are elements $s_i \in P(U_i)$. Fixing such sections $s_i$, we can write uniquely $s_i g_{ij} = s_j$ on $U_{ij}$ with $g_{ij} \in G(U_{ij})$. Different choices of $s_i$ amount to 1-coboundaries in cohomology; that is, the $g_{ij}$ define a cohomology class in the sheaf cohomology (more precisely Čech cohomology with sheaf coefficient) group $H^1(X, G)$. A trivial torsor corresponds to the identity element. Conversely, it is easy to see any class in $H^1(X, G)$ defines a $G$-torsor over $X$, unique up to a unique isomorphism.

== The universal torsor of a scheme and the fundamental group scheme ==
In this context torsors have to be taken in the fpqc topology. Let $S$ be a Dedekind scheme (e.g. the spectrum of a field) and $f:X\to S$ a faithfully flat morphism, locally of finite type. Assume $f$ has a section $x\in X(S)$. We say that $X$ has a fundamental group scheme $\pi_1(X,x)$ if there exist a pro-finite and flat $\pi_1(X,x)$-torsor $\hat{X}\to X$, called the universal torsor of $X$, with a section $\hat{x}\in \hat{X}_x(S)$ such that for any finite $G$-torsor $Y\to X$ with a section $y\in Y_x(S)$ there is a unique morphism of torsors $\hat{X}\to Y$ sending $\hat{x}$ to $y$. Its existence, conjectured by Alexander Grothendieck, has been proved by Madhav V. Nori for $S$ the spectrum of a field and by Marco Antei, Michel Emsalem and Carlo Gasbarri when $S$ is a Dedekind scheme of dimension 1.

== The contracted product ==
The contracted product is an operation allowing to build a new torsor from a given one, inflating or deflating its structure with some particular procedure also known as push forward. Though the construction can be presented in a wider generality we are only presenting here the following, easier and very common situation: we are given a right $G$-torsor $f:P\to X$ and a group scheme morphism $u:G\to M$. Then $G$ acts to the left on $M$ via left multiplication: $g\star m:= u(g)m$. We say that two elements $(p,m)\in P\times M$ and $(p',m')\in P\times M$ are equivalent if there exists $g\in G$ such that $(pg^{-1},g\star m)=(p',m')$. The space of orbits $P\times^G M:=\frac{P\times M}{G}$ is called the contracted product of $P$ through $u:G\to M$. Elements are denoted as $p\wedge m$. The contracted product is a scheme and has a structure of a right $M$-torsor when provided with the action $(p\wedge m)*m':=p\wedge (mm')$. Of course all the operations have to be intended functorially and not set theoretically. The name contracted product comes from the French produit contracté and in algebraic geometry it is preferred to its topological equivalent push forward.

== Morphisms of torsors and sub-torsors ==
Let $f:Y\to X$ and $h:T\to X$ be respectively a (right) $G$-torsor and a (right) $H$-torsor in some Grothendieck topology $\mathcal{T}$ where $G$ and $H$ are $X$-group schemes. A morphism (of torsors) from $Y$ to $T$ is a pair of morphisms $(a,b)$ where $a:Y\to T$ is a $X$-morphism and $b:G\to H$ is group-scheme morphism such that $\sigma_H\circ(a\times b)=a\circ \sigma_G$ where $\sigma_G$ and $\sigma_H$ are respectively the action of $G$ on $Y$ and of $H$ on $T$.

In this way $T$ can be proved to be isomorphic to the contracted product $Y\times^GH$. If the morphism $b:G\to H$ is a closed immersion then $Y$ is said to be a sub-torsor of $T$. We can also say, inheriting the language from topology, that $T$ admits a reduction of structure group scheme from $H$ to $G$.

=== Structure reduction theorem ===
An important result by Vladimir Drinfeld and Carlos Simpson goes as follows: let $X$ be a smooth projective curve over an algebraically closed field $k$, $G$ a semisimple, split and simply connected algebraic group (then a group scheme) and $P$ a $G$-torsor on $X_R = X \times_{\operatorname{Spec}k} \operatorname{Spec}R$, $R$ being a finitely generated $k$-algebra. Then there is an étale morphism $R \to R'$ such that $P \times_{X_R} X_{R'}$ admits a reduction of structure group scheme to a Borel subgroup-scheme of $G$.

== Further remarks ==
- It is common to consider a torsor for not just a group scheme but more generally for a group sheaf (e.g., fppf group sheaf).
- The category of torsors over a fixed base forms a stack. Conversely, a prestack can be stackified by taking the category of torsors (over the prestack).
- If $G$ is a connected algebraic group over a finite field $\mathbf{F}_q$, then any $G$-torsor over $\operatorname{Spec} \mathbf{F}_q$ is trivial. (Lang's theorem.)

== Invariants ==
If P is a parabolic subgroup of a smooth affine group scheme G with connected fibers, then its degree of instability, denoted by $\deg_i(P)$, is the degree of its Lie algebra $\operatorname{Lie}(P)$ as a vector bundle on X. The degree of instability of G is then $\deg_i(G) = \max \{ \deg_i(P) \mid P \subset G \text{ parabolic subgroups} \}$. If G is an algebraic group and E is a G-torsor, then the degree of instability of E is the degree of the inner form ${}^E G = \operatorname{Aut}_G(E)$ of G induced by E (which is a group scheme over X); i.e., $\deg_i (E) = \deg_i ({}^E G)$. E is said to be semi-stable if $\deg_i (E) \le 0$ and is stable if $\deg_i (E) < 0$.

== Examples of torsors in applied mathematics ==
According to John Baez, energy, voltage, position and the phase of a quantum-mechanical wavefunction are all examples of torsors in everyday physics; in each case, only relative comparisons can be measured, but a reference point must be chosen arbitrarily to make absolute values meaningful. However, the comparative values of relative energy, voltage difference, displacements and phase differences are not torsors, but can be represented by simpler structures such as real numbers, vectors or angles.

In basic calculus, he cites indefinite integrals as being examples of torsors.

== See also ==
- Beauville–Laszlo theorem
- Moduli stack of principal bundles
- Cox ring
