= Smooth morphism =

In algebraic geometry, a morphism $f:X \to S$ between schemes is said to be smooth if

- (i) it is locally of finite presentation
- (ii) it is flat, and
- (iii) for every geometric point $\overline{s} \to S$ the fiber $X_{\overline{s}} = X \times_S {\overline{s}}$ is regular.

(iii) means that each geometric fiber of f is a nonsingular variety (if it is separated). Thus, intuitively speaking, a smooth morphism gives a flat family of nonsingular varieties.

If S is the spectrum of an algebraically closed field and f is of finite type, then one recovers the definition of a nonsingular variety.

A singular variety is called smoothable if it can be put in a flat family so that the nearby fibers are all smooth. Such a family is called a smoothning of the variety.

== Equivalent definitions ==
There are many equivalent definitions of a smooth morphism. Let $f: X \to S$ be locally of finite presentation. Then the following are equivalent.

1. f is smooth.
2. f is formally smooth (see below).
3. f is flat and the sheaf of relative differentials $\Omega_{X/S}$ is locally free of rank equal to the relative dimension of $X/S$.
4. For any $x \in X$, there exists a neighborhood $\operatorname{Spec}B$ of x and a neighborhood $\operatorname{Spec}A$ of $f(x)$ such that $B = A[t_1, \dots, t_n]/(P_1, \dots, P_m)$ and the ideal generated by the m-by-m minors of $(\partial P_i/\partial t_j)$ is B.
5. Locally, f factors into $X \overset{g}\to \mathbb{A}^n_S \to S$ where g is étale.

A morphism of finite type is étale if and only if it is smooth and quasi-finite.

A smooth morphism is stable under base change and composition.

A smooth morphism is universally locally acyclic.

== Examples ==
Smooth morphisms are supposed to geometrically correspond to smooth submersions in differential geometry; that is, they are smooth locally trivial fibrations over some base space (by Ehresmann's theorem).

=== Smooth morphism to a point ===
Let $f$ be the morphism of schemes

$$\operatorname{Spec}_{\mathbb{C}}\left( \frac{\mathbb{C}[x,y]}{(f=y^2 - x^3 - x - 1)}\right) \to \operatorname{Spec}(\mathbb{C})$$

It is smooth because of the Jacobian condition: the Jacobian matrix

$$[ 3x^2 - 1, y ]$$

vanishes at the points $(1/\sqrt{3}, 0), (-1/\sqrt{3}, 0)$ which has an empty intersection with the polynomial, since

$$\begin{align}
f(1/\sqrt{3},0) &= 1 - \frac{1}{\sqrt{3}} - \frac{1}{3\sqrt{3}} \\
f(-1/\sqrt{3},0) &= \frac{1}{\sqrt{3}} + \frac{1}{3\sqrt{3}} - 1
\end{align}$$

which are both non-zero.

=== Trivial fibrations ===
Given a smooth scheme $Y$ the projection morphism

$$Y\times X \to X$$

is smooth.

=== Vector bundles ===
Every vector bundle $E \to X$ over a scheme is a smooth morphism. For example, it can be shown that the associated vector bundle of $\mathcal{O}(k)$ over $\mathbb{P}^n$ is the weighted projective space minus a point

$$O(k) = \mathbb{P}(1,\ldots,1,k) - \{[0:\cdots:0:1] \} \to \mathbb{P}^n$$

sending

$$[x_0:\cdots:x_n:x_{n+1}] \to [x_0:\cdots:x_n]$$

Notice that the direct sum bundles $O(k)\oplus O(l)$ can be constructed using the fiber product

$$O(k)\oplus O(l) = O(k)\times_X O(l)$$

=== Separable field extensions ===
Recall that a field extension $K \to L$ is called separable iff given a presentation

$$L = \frac{K[x]}{(f(x))}$$

we have that $gcd(f(x),f'(x)) = 1$. We can reinterpret this definition in terms of Kähler differentials as follows: the field extension is separable iff

$$\Omega_{L/K} = 0.$$

Notice that this includes every perfect field: finite fields and fields of characteristic 0.

== Non-examples ==
=== Singular varieties ===
If we consider $\operatorname{Spec}$ of the underlying algebra $R$ for a projective variety $X$, called the affine cone of $X$, then the point at the origin is always singular. For example, consider the affine cone of a quintic $3$-fold given by

$$x_0^5 + x_1^5 + x_2^5 + x_3^5 + x_4^5$$

Then the Jacobian matrix is given by

$$\begin{bmatrix}
5x_0^4 & 5x_1^4 & 5x_2^4 & 5x_3^4 & 5x_4^4
\end{bmatrix}$$

which vanishes at the origin, hence the cone is singular. Affine hypersurfaces like these are popular in singularity theory because of their relatively simple algebra but rich underlying structures.

Another example of a singular variety is the projective cone of a smooth variety: given a smooth projective variety $X\subset\mathbb{P}^n$ its projective cone is the union of all lines in $\mathbb{P}^{n+1}$ intersecting $X$. For example, the projective cone of the points

$$\text{Proj}\left( \frac{\mathbb{C}[x,y]}{(x^4 + y^4)} \right)$$

is the scheme

$$\text{Proj}\left( \frac{\mathbb{C}[x,y,z]}{(x^4 + y^4)} \right)$$

If we look in the $z\neq 0$ chart this is the scheme

$$\operatorname{Spec}\left( \frac{\mathbb{C}[X,Y]}{(X^4 + Y^4)} \right)$$

and project it down to the affine line $\mathbb{A}^1_Y$, this is a family of four points degenerating at the origin. The non-singularity of this scheme can also be checked using the Jacobian condition.

=== Degenerating families ===
Consider the flat family

$$\operatorname{Spec}\left( \frac{\mathbb{C}[t,x,y]}{(xy - t)} \right) \to \mathbb{A}^1_t$$

Then the fibers are all smooth except for the point at the origin. Since smoothness is stable under base-change, this family is not smooth.

=== Non-separable field extensions ===
For example, the field $\mathbb{F}_p(t^p) \to \mathbb{F}_p(t)$ is non-separable, hence the associated morphism of schemes is not smooth. If we look at the minimal polynomial of the field extension,

$$f(x) = x^p - t^p$$

then $df = 0$, hence the Kähler differentials will be non-zero.

== Formally smooth morphism ==
One can define smoothness without reference to geometry. We say that an S-scheme X is formally smooth if for any affine S-scheme T and a subscheme $T_0$ of T given by a nilpotent ideal, $X(T) \to X(T_0)$ is surjective where we wrote $X(T) = \operatorname{Hom}_S(T, X)$. Then a morphism locally of finite presentation is smooth if and only if it is formally smooth.

In the definition of "formally smooth", if we replace surjective by "bijective" (resp. "injective"), then we get the definition of formally étale (resp. formally unramified).

== Smooth base change ==
Let S be a scheme and $\operatorname{char}(S)$ denote the image of the structure map $S \to \operatorname{Spec}\mathbb{Z}$. The smooth base change theorem states the following: let $f: X \to S$ be a quasi-compact morphism, $g: S' \to S$ a smooth morphism and $\mathcal{F}$ a torsion sheaf on $X_\text{et}$. If for every $0 \ne p$ in $\operatorname{char}(S)$, $p:\mathcal{F} \to \mathcal{F}$ is injective, then the base change morphism $g^*(R^if_*\mathcal{F}) \to R^if'_*(g'^*\mathcal{F})$ is an isomorphism.

== See also ==
- smooth algebra
- regular embedding
