= Essentially finite vector bundle =

Type of vector bundle

In mathematics, an essentially finite vector bundle is a particular type of vector bundle defined by Madhav V. Nori, as the main tool in the construction of the fundamental group scheme. Even if the definition is not intuitive there is a nice characterization that makes essentially finite vector bundles quite natural objects to study in algebraic geometry. The following notion of finite vector bundle is due to André Weil and will be needed to define essentially finite vector bundles:

== Finite vector bundles ==
Let $X$ be a scheme and $V$ a vector bundle on $X$. For $f = a_0 + a_1 x + \ldots + a_n x^n \in \mathbb{Z}_{\ge 0}[x]$ an integral polynomial with nonnegative coefficients define

$$f(V) := \mathcal{O}_X^{\oplus a_0} \oplus V^{\oplus a_1} \oplus \left(V^{\otimes 2}\right)^{\oplus a_2} \oplus \ldots \oplus \left(V ^{\otimes n}\right)^{\oplus a_n}$$

Then $V$ is called finite if there are two distinct polynomials $f,g\in \mathbb{Z}_{\ge 0}[x]$ for which $f(V)$ is isomorphic to $g(V)$.

== Definition ==
The following two definitions coincide whenever $X$ is a reduced, connected and proper scheme over a perfect field.

=== According to Borne and Vistoli ===
A vector bundle is essentially finite if it is the kernel of a morphism $u:F_1\to F_2$ where $F_1, F_2$ are finite vector bundles.

=== The original definition of Nori ===
A vector bundle is essentially finite if it is a subquotient of a finite vector bundle in the category of Nori-semistable vector bundles.

== Properties ==
- Let $X$ be a reduced and connected scheme over a perfect field $k$ endowed with a section $x\in X(k)$. Then a vector bundle $V$ over $X$ is essentially finite if and only if there exists a finite $k$-group scheme $G$ and a $G$-torsor $p:P\to X$ such that $V$ becomes trivial over $P$ (i.e. $p^*(V)\cong O_P^{\oplus r}$, where $r=rk(V)$).
- When $X$ is a reduced, connected and proper scheme over a perfect field with a point $x\in X(k)$ then the category $EF(X)$ of essentially finite vector bundles provided with the usual tensor product $\otimes_{\mathcal{O}_X}$, the trivial object $\mathcal{O}_X$ and the fiber functor $x^*$ is a Tannakian category.
- The $k$-affine group scheme $\pi_1(X,x)$ naturally associated to the Tannakian category $EF(X)$ is called the fundamental group scheme.
