= Fundamental group scheme =

In mathematics, the fundamental group scheme is a group scheme canonically attached to a scheme over a Dedekind scheme (e.g. the spectrum of a field or the spectrum of a discrete valuation ring). It is a generalisation of the étale fundamental group. Although its existence was conjectured by Alexander Grothendieck, the first proof of its existence is due, for schemes defined over fields, to Madhav Nori. A proof of its existence for schemes defined over Dedekind schemes is due to Marco Antei, Michel Emsalem and Carlo Gasbarri.

== History ==
The (topological) fundamental group associated with a topological space is the group of the equivalence classes under homotopy of the loops contained in the space. Although it is still being studied for the classification of algebraic varieties even in algebraic geometry, for many applications the fundamental group has been found to be inadequate for the classification of objects, such as schemes, that are more than just topological spaces. The same topological space may have indeed several distinct scheme structures, yet its topological fundamental group will always be the same. Therefore, it became necessary to create a new object that would take into account the existence of a structural sheaf together with a topological space. This led to the creation of the étale fundamental group, the projective limit of all finite groups acting on étale coverings of the given scheme $X$. Nevertheless, in positive characteristic the latter has obvious limitations, since it does not take into account the existence of group schemes that are not étale (e.g., $\alpha_p$ when the characteristic is $p>0$) and that act on torsors over $X$, a natural generalization of the coverings. It was from this idea that Grothendieck hoped for the creation of a new true fundamental group (un vrai groupe fondamental, in French), the existence of which he conjectured, back in the early 1960s in his celebrated SGA 1, Chapitre X. More than a decade had to pass before a first result on the existence of the fundamental group scheme came to light. As mentioned in the introduction this result was due to Madhav Nori who in 1976 published his first construction of this new object $\pi_1(X,x)$ for schemes defined over fields. As for the name he decided to abandon the true fundamental group name and he called it, as we know it nowadays, the fundamental group scheme. It is also often denoted as $\pi^N(X,x)$, where $N$ stands for Nori, in order to distinguish it from the previous fundamental groups and to its modern generalizations. The demonstration of the existence of $\pi_1(X,x)$ defined on regular schemes of dimension 1 had to wait about forty more years. There are various generalizations such as the $S$-fundamental group scheme $\pi^S(X,x)$ and the quasi finite fundamental group scheme $\pi^{\text{qf}}(X,x)$.

== Definition and construction ==
The original definition and the first construction have been suggested by Nori for schemes $X$ over fields. Then they have been adapted to a wider range of schemes. So far the only complete theories exist for schemes defined over schemes of dimension 0 (spectra of fields) or dimension 1 (Dedekind schemes) so this is what will be discussed hereafter:

=== Definition ===
Let $S$ be a Dedekind scheme (which can be the spectrum of a field) and $f:X\to S$ a faithfully flat morphism, locally of finite type. Assume $f$ has a section $x\in X(S)$. We say that $X$ has a fundamental group scheme $\pi_1(X,x)$ if there exist a pro-finite and flat $\pi_1(X,x)$-torsor $\hat{X}\to X$, with a section $\hat{x}\in \hat{X}_x(S)$ such that for any finite $G$-torsor $Y\to X$ with a section $y\in Y_x(S)$ there is a unique morphism of torsors $\hat{X}\to Y$ sending $\hat{x}$ to $y$.

=== Over a field ===
There are nowadays several existence results for the fundamental group scheme of a scheme $X$ defined over a field $k$. Nori provides the first existence theorem when $k$ is perfect and $X\to \text{Spec}(k)$ is a proper morphism of schemes with $X$ reduced and connected scheme. Assuming the existence of a section $x:\text{Spec}(k)\to X$, then the fundamental group scheme $\pi_1(X,x)$ of $X$ in $x$ is built as the affine group scheme naturally associated to the neutral tannakian category (over $k$) of essentially finite vector bundles over $X$. Nori also proves a that the fundamental group scheme exists when $k$ is any field and $X$ is any finite type, reduced and connected scheme over $k$. In this situation however there are no tannakian categories involved. Since then several other existence results have been added, including some non reduced schemes.

=== Over a Dedekind scheme ===
Let $S$ be a Dedekind scheme of dimension 1, $X$ any connected scheme and $X\to S$ a faithfully flat morphism locally of finite type. Assume the existence of a section $x:S\to X$. Then the existence of the fundamental group scheme $\pi_1(X,x)$ as a group scheme over $S$ has been proved by Marco Antei, Michel Emsalem and Carlo Gasbarri in the following situations:

- when for every $s\in S$ the fibres $X_s$ are reduced
- when for every $x\in X\setminus X_{\eta}$ the local ring $\mathcal{O}_x$ is integrally closed (e.g. when $X$ is normal).

Over a Dedekind scheme, however, there is no need to only consider finite group schemes: indeed quasi-finite group schemes are also a very natural generalization of finite group schemes over fields. This is why Antei, Emsalem and Gasbarri also defined the quasi-finite fundamental group scheme $\pi^{\text{qf}}(X,x)$ as follows: let $S$ be a Dedekind scheme and $f:X\to S$ a faithfully flat morphism, locally of finite type. Assume $f$ has a section $x\in X(S)$. We say that $X$ has a quasi-finite fundamental group scheme $\pi^{\text{qf}}(X,x)$ if there exist a pro-quasi-finite and flat $\pi^{\text{qf}}(X,x)$-torsor $\hat{X}\to X$, with a section $\hat{x}\in \hat{X}_x(S)$ such that for any quasi-finite $G$-torsor $Y\to X$ with a section $y\in Y_x(S)$ there is a unique morphism of torsors $\hat{X}\to Y$ sending $\hat{x}$ to $y$. They proved the existence of $\pi^{\text{qf}}(X,x)$ when for every $s\in S$ the fibres $X_s$ are integral and normal.

== Properties ==
=== Connections with the étale fundamental group ===
One can consider the largest pro-étale quotient of $\pi_1(X,x)$. When the base scheme $S$ is the spectrum of an algebraically closed field $k$ then it coincides with the étale fundamental group $\pi^{\text{ét}}(X,x)$. More precisely the group of points $\pi_1(X,x)(k)$ is isomorphic to $\pi^{\text{ét}}(X,x)$.

=== The product formula ===
For $X$ and $Y$ any two smooth projective schemes over an algebraically closed field $k$ the product formula holds, that is $\pi_1(X,x)\times_k\pi_1(Y,y)\simeq \pi_1(X\times_k Y,x\times_k y)$. This result was conjectured by Nori and proved by Vikram Mehta and Subramanian.
