= Nori-semistable vector bundle =

Type of vector bundle

In mathematics, a Nori semistable vector bundle is a particular type of vector bundle whose first definition has been first implicitly suggested by Madhav V. Nori, as one of the main ingredients for the construction of the fundamental group scheme. The original definition given by Nori was obviously not called Nori semistable. Also, Nori's definition was different from the one suggested nowadays. The category of Nori semistable vector bundles contains the Tannakian category of essentially finite vector bundles, whose naturally associated group scheme is the fundamental group scheme $\pi_1(X,x)$.

== Definition ==
Let $X$ be a scheme over a field $k$ and $V$ a vector bundle on $X$. It is said that $V$ is Nori semistable if for any smooth and proper curve $C$ over $\bar k$ and any morphism $j:C\to X$ the pull back $j^*(V)$ is semistable of degree 0.

== Difference with Nori's original definition ==
Nori semistable vector bundles were called by Nori semistable causing a lot of confusion with the already existing definition of semistable vector bundles. More importantly Nori simply said that the restriction of $V$ to any curve in $X$ had to be semistable of degree 0. Then for instance in positive characteristic a morphism $j$ like the Frobenius morphism was not included in Nori's original definition. The importance of including it is that the above definition makes the category of Nori semistable vector bundles tannakian and the group scheme associated to it is the $S$-fundamental group scheme $\pi^S(X,x)$. Instead, Nori's original definition didn't give rise to a Tannakian category but only to an abelian category.
