= Vikram Bhagvandas Mehta =

Indian mathematician (1946–2014)

Vikram Bhagvandas Mehta (August 15, 1946 – June 4, 2014) was an Indian mathematician who worked on algebraic geometry and vector bundles. Together with Annamalai Ramanathan he introduced the notion of Frobenius split varieties, which led to the solution of several problems about Schubert varieties. He is also known to have worked, from the 2000s onward, on the fundamental group scheme. In 2002, he and Subramanian published a proof of a conjecture by Madhav V. Nori that brought back into the limelight the theory of this object that until then had met with little success.

== Awards ==
The Council of Scientific and Industrial Research awarded him the Shanti Swarup Bhatnagar Prize for Science and Technology in 1991 for his work in algebraic geometry.
