= Faithfully flat =

Faithfully flat may refer to:

- Faithfully flat morphism, in the theory of schemes in algebraic geometry
- Faithfully flat module, for sequences in algebra
