= Flat topology =

In mathematics, the flat topology is a Grothendieck topology used in algebraic geometry. It is used to define the theory of flat cohomology; it also plays a fundamental role in the theory of descent (faithfully flat descent). The term flat here comes from flat modules.

There are several slightly different flat topologies, the most common of which are the fppf topology and the fpqc topology. fppf stands for fidèlement plate de présentation finie, and in this topology, a morphism of affine schemes is a covering morphism if it is faithfully flat and of finite presentation. fpqc stands for fidèlement plate et quasi-compacte, and in this topology, a morphism of affine schemes is a covering morphism if it is faithfully flat and a quasi-compact morphism. In both categories, a covering family is defined to be a family which is a cover on Zariski open subsets. In the fpqc topology, any faithfully flat and quasi-compact morphism is a cover. These topologies are closely related to descent. The "pure" faithfully flat topology without any further finiteness conditions such as quasi compactness or finite presentation is not used much as it is not subcanonical; in other words, representable functors need not be sheaves.

Unfortunately the terminology for flat topologies is not standardized. Some authors use the term "topology" for a pretopology, and there are several slightly different pretopologies sometimes called the fppf or fpqc (pre)topology, which sometimes give the same topology.

Flat cohomology was introduced by Grothendieck in about 1960.

== The big and small fppf sites ==
Let X be an affine scheme. We define an fppf cover of X to be a finite and jointly surjective family of morphisms

(φ_{a} : X_{a} → X)

with each X_{a} affine and each φ_{a} flat, finitely presented. This generates a pretopology: for X arbitrary, we define an fppf cover of X to be a family

(φ_{a} : X_{a} → X)

which is an fppf cover after base changing to an open affine subscheme of X. This pretopology generates a topology called the fppf topology. (This is not the same as the topology we would get if we started with arbitrary X and X_{a} and took covering families to be jointly surjective families of flat, finitely presented morphisms.) We write Fppf for the category of schemes with the fppf topology.

The small fppf site of X is the category O(X_{fppf}) whose objects are schemes U with a fixed morphism U → X which is part of some covering family. (This does not imply that the morphism is flat, finitely presented.) The morphisms are morphisms of schemes compatible with the fixed maps to X. The large fppf site of X is the category Fppf/X, that is, the category of schemes with a fixed map to X, considered with the fppf topology.

"Fppf" is an abbreviation for "fidèlement plate de présentation finie", that is, "faithfully flat and of finite presentation". Every surjective family of flat and finitely presented morphisms is a covering family for this topology, hence the name. The definition of the fppf pretopology can also be given with an extra quasi-finiteness condition; it follows from Corollary 17.16.2 in EGA IV_{4} that this gives the same topology.

== The big and small fpqc sites ==
Let X be an affine scheme. We define an fpqc cover of X to be a finite and jointly surjective family of morphisms {u_{α} : X_{α} → X} with each X_{α} affine and each u_{α} flat and quasicompact. This generates a pretopology: For X arbitrary, we define an fpqc cover of X to be a family {u_{α} : X_{α} → X} which is an fpqc cover after base changing to an open affine subscheme of X. This pretopology generates a topology called the fpqc topology. (This is not the same as the topology we would get if we started with arbitrary X and X_{α} and took covering families to be jointly surjective families of flat morphisms.) We write Fpqc for the category of schemes with the fpqc topology.

The small fpqc site of X is the category O(X_{fpqc}) whose objects are schemes U with a fixed morphism U → X which is part of some covering family. The morphisms are morphisms of schemes compatible with the fixed maps to X. The large fpqc site of X is the category Fpqc/X, that is, the category of schemes with a fixed map to X, considered with the fpqc topology.

"Fpqc" is an abbreviation for "fidèlement plate quasi-compacte", that is, "faithfully flat and quasi-compact". Every surjective family of flat and quasi-compact morphisms is a covering family for this topology, hence the name.

== Flat cohomology ==
The procedure for defining the cohomology groups is the standard one: cohomology is defined as the sequence of derived functors of the functor taking the sections of a sheaf of abelian groups.

While such groups have a number of applications, they are not in general easy to compute, except in cases where they reduce to other theories, such as the étale cohomology.

== Example ==
The following example shows why the "faithfully flat topology" without any finiteness conditions does not behave well. Suppose X is the affine line over an algebraically closed field k. For each closed point x of X we can consider the local ring R_{x} at this point, which is a discrete valuation ring whose spectrum has one closed point and one open (generic) point. We glue these spectra together by identifying their open points to get a scheme Y. There is a natural map from Y to X. The affine line X is covered by the sets Spec(R_{x}) which are open in the faithfully flat topology, and each of these sets has a natural map to Y, and these maps are the same on intersections. However they cannot be combined to give a map from X to Y, because the underlying spaces of X and Y have different topologies.

== See also ==
- fpqc morphism
