= Marco Antei =

Italian mathematician and LGBT activist

- Born: 2 March 1978 (age 48); Sanremo
- Education: University of Lille
- Scientific career
- Workplaces: University of Lille, Max Planck Institute for Mathematics, KAIST, Ben-Gurion University of the Negev, Côte d'Azur University, University of Costa Rica, Lucerne University of Applied Sciences and Arts
- Thesis: Extension de torseurs (2008)

Marco Antei (born 1978, Sanremo) is an Italian mathematician and LGBT+ activist.

== Career ==
Antei was awarded his PhD in mathematics in 2008 from the University of Lille under the supervision of Michel Emsalem. He later worked at the Max Planck Institute for Mathematics in Bonn, the KAIST in Daejeon, the Ben-Gurion University of the Negev in Beersheba, the Côte d'Azur University in Nice before joining the University of Costa Rica. He has been lecturer at Lucerne University of Applied Sciences and Arts since 2022. Antei studies within the field of geometry. His areas of interest in research focus on algebraic and arithmetic geometry, and applications. He particularly studies the fundamental group scheme, torsors and their connections.

== The fundamental group scheme ==
The existence of the fundamental group scheme was conjectured by Alexander Grothendieck, while the first proof of its existence is due, for schemes defined over fields, to Madhav Nori. Antei, Michel Emsalem and Carlo Gasbarri proved the existence of the fundamental group scheme $\pi_1(X,x)$ for schemes defined over Dedekind schemes and they also defined, and proved the existence of, the quasi-finite fundamental group scheme $\pi^{\text{qf}}(X,x)$.

== Award ==
In 2020, Antei received the Innovating professor award at the University of Costa Rica, for being able to move from in presence classes to virtual classes, at the beginning of the COVID-19 pandemic, in the best possible way. The awarded professors have been selected by the students of the UCR.

== Activism ==
Antei stands out for his commitment to the fight for the rights of the LGBT+ community. In particular, in 2015 he conceived and co-founded the first LGBT+ association in the province of Imperia, M.I.A. (Movimento Imperiese Arcobaleno), the Arcigay Imperia local committee, affiliated with Italy's largest LGBT+ association, Arcigay. He served as president until 2018, and then again from January 2023. He definitively left the office in December 2025. During his first term, he also co-organized in November 2016 the first Transgender Day of Remembrance in the city of Sanremo. In 2020, he took part in a remote meeting with European Commission President Ursula von der Leyen, in which the rights of LGBT+ people within the European Union were discussed, with particular emphasis on the situations in Hungary and Poland. During his final term, the association under his presidency, in collaboration with Agedo Genova, created the Premio Queer, an award unofficially linked to the Sanremo Music Festival.
