= Formally étale morphism =

Algebraic geometry

In commutative algebra and algebraic geometry, a morphism is called formally étale if it has a lifting property that is analogous to being a local diffeomorphism.

== Formally étale homomorphisms of rings ==
Let A be a topological ring, and let B be a topological A-algebra. Then B is formally étale if for all discrete A-algebras C, all nilpotent ideals J of C, and all continuous A-homomorphisms u : B → C/J, there exists a unique continuous A-algebra map v : B → C such that u = pv, where p : C → C/J is the canonical projection.

Formally étale is equivalent to formally smooth plus formally unramified.

== Formally étale morphisms of schemes ==
Since the structure sheaf of a scheme naturally carries only the discrete topology, the notion of formally étale for schemes is analogous to formally étale for the discrete topology for rings. That is, a morphism of schemes f : X → Y is formally étale if for every affine Y-scheme Z, every nilpotent sheaf of ideals J on Z with i : Z_{0} → Z be the closed immersion determined by J, and every Y-morphism g : Z_{0} → X, there exists a unique Y-morphism s : Z → X such that g = si.

It is equivalent to let Z be any Y-scheme and let J be a locally nilpotent sheaf of ideals on Z.

== Properties ==
- Open immersions are formally étale.
- The property of being formally étale is preserved under composites, base change, and fibered products.
- If f : X → Y and g : Y → Z are morphisms of schemes, g is formally unramified, and gf is formally étale, then f is formally étale. In particular, if g is formally étale, then f is formally étale if and only if gf is.
- The property of being formally étale is local on the source and target.
- The property of being formally étale can be checked on stalks. One can show that a morphism of rings f : A → B is formally étale if and only if for every prime Q of B, the induced map A → B_{Q} is formally étale. Consequently, f is formally étale if and only if for every prime Q of B, the map A_{P} → B_{Q} is formally étale, where P = f^{−1}(Q).

== Examples ==
- Localizations are formally étale.
- Finite separable field extensions are formally étale. More generally, any (commutative) flat separable A-algebra B is formally étale.

== See also ==
- Formally unramified
- Formally smooth
- Étale morphism
