= Diagonal subgroup =

In the mathematical discipline of group theory, for a given group G, the diagonal subgroup of the n-fold direct product G^{n} is the subgroup

$$\{(g, \dots, g) \in G^n : g \in G\}.$$

This subgroup is isomorphic to G.

== Properties and applications ==
- If G acts on a set X, the n-fold diagonal subgroup has a natural action on the Cartesian product X^{n} induced by the action of G on X, defined by

$$(x_1, \dots, x_n) \cdot (g, \dots, g) = (x_1 \!\cdot g, \dots, x_n \!\cdot g).$$

- If G acts n-transitively on X, then the n-fold diagonal subgroup acts transitively on X^{n}. More generally, for an integer k, if G acts kn-transitively on X, G acts k-transitively on X^{n}.
- Burnside's lemma can be proved using the action of the twofold diagonal subgroup.

== See also ==
- Diagonalizable group
