= Annamalai Ramanathan =

Indian mathematician

Annamalai Ramanathan (29 August 1946 – 12 March 1993) was an Indian mathematician in the field of algebraic geometry, who introduced the notion of Frobenius splitting of algebraic varieties jointly with Vikram Bhagvandas Mehta in (Mehta & Ramanathan 1985). The notion of Frobenius splitting led to the solution of many classical problems, in particular a proof of the Demazure character formula and results on the equations defining Schubert varieties in general flag manifolds.

== Research career ==
Ramanathan got his BSc in mathematics at Ramakrishna Mission Vivekananda College, and was recruited to attend TIFR, where he got his Ph.D. in mathematics in 1976. His thesis on moduli for principal bundles was published in 1996 in two papers in Proc. Indian Acad. Sci. three years after his death.

Ramanathan, was a professor of mathematics at the TIFR in Bombay, India. He has also been employed at University of Bonn, Johns Hopkins University and University of Illinois at Urbana-Champaign. Ramanathan made significant contributions to many areas of mathematics, including moduli of vector bundles, Gauge theory, algebraic geometry in positive characteristic and representation theory.

== Awards ==
The Council of Scientific and Industrial Research awarded he and his collaborator Vikram Bhagvandas Mehta the Shanti Swarup Bhatnagar Prize for Science and Technology (the Indian presidential award for achievement in the mathematical sciences) in 1991 for his work in algebraic geometry.

He was also elected a Fellow of Indian Academy of Sciences in 1991.

== Personal life ==
During his tenure as a visiting professor at University of Illinois at Urbana-Champaign, Ramanathan died in Chicago, Friday, 12 March 1993, of complications following treatment for a heart attack. He is survived by his wife RM. Vasantha and three daughters Lakshmi, Valli, and Priya.

== Sources ==
- Mehta, V. B.; Ramanathan, A. (1985), "Frobenius splitting and cohomology vanishing for Schubert varieties", Annals of Mathematics, Second Series, 122 (1): 27–40, doi:10.2307/1971368, ISSN 0003-486X, JSTOR 1971368, MR 0799251
- Ramanan, S.; Ramanathan, A. (1985), "Projective normality of flag varieties and Schubert varieties" (PDF), Inventiones Mathematicae, 79 (2): 217–224, Bibcode:1985InMat..79..217R, doi:10.1007/BF01388970, ISSN 0020-9910, MR 0778124, S2CID 123105737
