= Group functor =

In mathematics, a group functor is a group-valued functor on the category of commutative rings. Although it is typically viewed as a generalization of a group scheme, the notion itself involves no scheme theory. Because of this feature, some authors, notably Waterhouse and Milne (who followed Waterhouse), develop the theory of group schemes based on the notion of group functor instead of scheme theory.

A formal group is usually defined as a particular kind of a group functor.

== Group functor as a generalization of a group scheme ==
A scheme may be thought of as a contravariant functor from the category $\mathsf{Sch}_S$ of S-schemes to the category of sets satisfying the gluing axiom; the perspective known as the functor of points. Under this perspective, a group scheme is a contravariant functor from $\mathsf{Sch}_S$ to the category of groups that is a Zariski sheaf (i.e., satisfying the gluing axiom for the Zariski topology).

For example, if Γ is a finite group, then consider the functor that sends Spec(R) to the set of locally constant functions on it. For example, the group scheme

$$SL_2 = \operatorname{Spec}\left( \frac{\mathbb{Z}[a,b,c,d]}{(ad - bc - 1)} \right)$$

can be described as the functor

$$\operatorname{Hom}_{\textbf{CRing}}\left(\frac{\mathbb{Z}[a,b,c,d]}{(ad - bc - 1)}, -\right)$$

If we take a ring, for example, $\mathbb{C}$, then

$$\begin{align}
SL_2(\mathbb{C}) &= \operatorname{Hom}_{\textbf{CRing}}\left(\frac{\mathbb{Z}[a,b,c,d]}{(ad - bc - 1)}, \mathbb{C}\right) \\
&\cong \left\{ \begin{bmatrix}a & b \\ c & d \end{bmatrix} \in M_2(\mathbb{C}) : ad-bc = 1 \right\}
\end{align}$$

== Group sheaf ==
It is useful to consider a group functor that respects a topology (if any) of the underlying category; namely, one that is a sheaf and a group functor that is a sheaf is called a group sheaf. The notion appears in particular in the discussion of a torsor (where a choice of topology is an important matter).

For example, a p-divisible group is an example of a fppf group sheaf (a group sheaf with respect to the fppf topology).

== See also ==
- automorphism group functor
