= Group scheme =

Type of mathematical object

In mathematics, a group scheme is a type of object from algebraic geometry equipped with a composition law. Group schemes arise naturally as symmetries of schemes, and they generalize algebraic groups, in the sense that all algebraic groups have group scheme structure, but group schemes are not necessarily connected, smooth, or defined over a field. This extra generality allows one to study richer infinitesimal structures, and this can help one to understand and answer questions of arithmetic significance. The category of group schemes is somewhat better behaved than that of group varieties, since all homomorphisms have kernels, and there is a well-behaved deformation theory. Group schemes that are not algebraic groups play a significant role in arithmetic geometry and algebraic topology, since they come up in contexts of Galois representations and moduli problems. The initial development of the theory of group schemes was due to Alexander Grothendieck, Michel Raynaud and Michel Demazure in the early 1960s.

== Definition ==
A group scheme is a group object in a category of schemes that has fiber products and some final object S. That is, it is an S-scheme G equipped with one of the equivalent sets of data

- a triple of morphisms μ: G ×_{S} G → G, e: S → G, and ι: G → G, satisfying the usual compatibilities of groups (namely associativity of μ, identity, and inverse axioms)
- a functor from schemes over S to the category of groups, such that composition with the forgetful functor to sets is equivalent to the presheaf corresponding to G under the Yoneda embedding. (See also: group functor.)

A homomorphism of group schemes is a map of schemes that respects multiplication. This can be precisely phrased either by saying that a map f satisfies the equation fμ = μ(f × f), or by saying that f is a natural transformation of functors from schemes to groups (rather than just sets).

A left action of a group scheme G on a scheme X is a morphism G ×_{S} X → X that induces a left action of the group G(T) on the set X(T) for any S-scheme T. Right actions are defined similarly. Any group scheme admits natural left and right actions on its underlying scheme by multiplication and conjugation. Conjugation is an action by automorphisms, i.e., it commutes with the group structure, and this induces linear actions on naturally derived objects, such as its Lie algebra, and the algebra of left-invariant differential operators.

An S-group scheme G is commutative if the group G(T) is an abelian group for all S-schemes T. There are several other equivalent conditions, such as conjugation inducing a trivial action, or inversion map ι being a group scheme automorphism.

== Constructions ==
- Given a group G, one can form the constant group scheme G_{S}. As a scheme, it is a disjoint union of copies of S, and by choosing an identification of these copies with elements of G, one can define the multiplication, unit, and inverse maps by transport of structure. As a functor, it takes any S-scheme T to a product of copies of the group G, where the number of copies is equal to the number of connected components of T. G_{S} is affine over S if and only if G is a finite group. However, one can take a projective limit of finite constant group schemes to get profinite group schemes, which appear in the study of fundamental groups and Galois representations or in the theory of the fundamental group scheme, and these are affine of infinite type. More generally, by taking a locally constant sheaf of groups on S, one obtains a locally constant group scheme, for which monodromy on the base can induce non-trivial automorphisms on the fibers.
- The existence of fiber products of schemes allows one to make several constructions. Finite direct products of group schemes have a canonical group scheme structure. Given an action of one group scheme on another by automorphisms, one can form semidirect products by following the usual set-theoretic construction. Kernels of group scheme homomorphisms are group schemes, by taking a fiber product over the unit map from the base. Base change sends group schemes to group schemes.
- Group schemes can be formed from smaller group schemes by taking restriction of scalars with respect to some morphism of base schemes, although one needs finiteness conditions to be satisfied to ensure representability of the resulting functor. When this morphism is along a finite extension of fields, it is known as Weil restriction.
- For any abelian group A, one can form the corresponding diagonalizable group D(A), defined as a functor by setting D(A)(T) to be the set of abelian group homomorphisms from A to invertible global sections of O_{T} for each S-scheme T. If S is affine, D(A) can be formed as the spectrum of a group ring. More generally, one can form groups of multiplicative type by letting A be a non-constant sheaf of abelian groups on S.
- For a subgroup scheme H of a group scheme G, the functor that takes an S-scheme T to G(T)/H(T) is in general not a sheaf, and even its sheafification is in general not representable as a scheme. However, if H is finite, flat, and closed in G, then the quotient is representable, and admits a canonical left G-action by translation. If the restriction of this action to H is trivial, then H is said to be normal, and the quotient scheme admits a natural group law. Representability holds in many other cases, such as when H is closed in G and both are affine.

== Examples ==
- The multiplicative group G_{m} has the punctured affine line as its underlying scheme, and as a functor, it sends an S-scheme T to the multiplicative group of invertible global sections of the structure sheaf. It can be described as the diagonalizable group D(Z) associated to the integers. Over an affine base such as Spec A, it is the spectrum of the ring A[x,y]/(xy − 1), which is also written A[x, x^{−1}]. The unit map is given by sending x to one, multiplication is given by sending x to x ⊗ x, and the inverse is given by sending x to x^{−1}. Algebraic tori form an important class of commutative group schemes, defined either by the property of being locally on S a product of copies of G_{m}, or as groups of multiplicative type associated to finitely generated free abelian groups.
- The general linear group GL_{n} is an affine algebraic variety that can be viewed as the multiplicative group of the n by n matrix ring variety. As a functor, it sends an S-scheme T to the group of invertible n by n matrices whose entries are global sections of T. Over an affine base, one can construct it as a quotient of a polynomial ring in n^{2} + 1 variables by an ideal encoding the invertibility of the determinant. Alternatively, it can be constructed using 2n^{2} variables, with relations describing an ordered pair of mutually inverse matrices.
- For any positive integer n, the group μ_{n} of nth roots of unity is the kernel of the nth power map from G_{m} to itself. As a functor, it sends any S-scheme T to the group of global sections f of T such that f^{n} = 1. Over an affine base such as Spec A, it is the spectrum of A[x]/(x^{n}−1). If n is not invertible in the base, then this scheme is not smooth. In particular, over a field of characteristic p, μ_{p} is not smooth.
- The additive group G_{a} has the affine line A^{1} as its underlying scheme. As a functor, it sends any S-scheme T to the underlying additive group of global sections of the structure sheaf. Over an affine base such as Spec A, it is the spectrum of the polynomial ring A[x]. The unit map is given by sending x to zero, the multiplication is given by sending x to 1 ⊗ x + x ⊗ 1, and the inverse is given by sending x to −x.
- If p = 0 in S for some prime number p, then the taking of pth powers induces an endomorphism of G_{a}, and the kernel is the group scheme α_{p}. Over an affine base such as Spec A, it is the spectrum of A[x]/(x^{p}).
- The automorphism group of the affine line (cf. affine group) is isomorphic to the semidirect product of G_{a} by G_{m}, where the additive group acts by translations, and the multiplicative group acts by dilations. The subgroup fixing a chosen basepoint is isomorphic to the multiplicative group, and taking the basepoint to be the identity of an additive group structure identifies G_{m} with the automorphism group of G_{a}.
- A smooth genus one curve with a marked point (i.e., an elliptic curve) has a unique group scheme structure with that point as the identity. Unlike the previous positive-dimensional examples, elliptic curves are projective (in particular proper).

== Basic properties ==
Suppose that G is a group scheme of finite type over a field k. Let G^{0} be the connected component of the identity, i.e., the maximal connected subgroup scheme. Then G is an extension of a finite étale group scheme by G^{0}. G has a unique maximal reduced subscheme G_{red}, and if k is perfect, then G_{red} is a smooth group variety that is a subgroup scheme of G. The quotient scheme is the spectrum of a local ring of finite rank.

Any affine group scheme is the spectrum of a commutative Hopf algebra (over a base S, this is given by the relative spectrum of an O_{S}-algebra). The multiplication, unit, and inverse maps of the group scheme are given by the comultiplication, counit, and antipode structures in the Hopf algebra. The unit and multiplication structures in the Hopf algebra are intrinsic to the underlying scheme. For an arbitrary group scheme G, the ring of global sections also has a commutative Hopf algebra structure, and by taking its spectrum, one obtains the maximal affine quotient group. Affine group varieties are known as linear algebraic groups, since they can be embedded as subgroups of general linear groups.

Complete connected group schemes are in some sense opposite to affine group schemes, since the completeness implies all global sections are exactly those pulled back from the base, and in particular, they have no nontrivial maps to affine schemes. Any complete group variety (variety here meaning reduced and geometrically irreducible separated scheme of finite type over a field) is automatically commutative, by an argument involving the action of conjugation on jet spaces of the identity. Complete group varieties are called abelian varieties. This generalizes to the notion of abelian scheme; a group scheme G over a base S is abelian if the structural morphism from G to S is proper and smooth with geometrically connected fibers. They are automatically projective, and they have many applications, e.g., in geometric class field theory and throughout algebraic geometry. A complete group scheme over a field need not be commutative, however; for example, any finite group scheme is complete.

== Finite flat group schemes ==
A group scheme G over a noetherian scheme S is finite and flat if and only if O_{G} is a locally free O_{S}-module of finite rank. The rank is a locally constant function on S, and is called the order of G. The order of a constant group scheme is equal to the order of the corresponding group, and in general, order behaves well with respect to base change and finite flat restriction of scalars.

Among the finite flat group schemes, the constants (cf. example above) form a special class, and over an algebraically closed field of characteristic zero, the category of finite groups is equivalent to the category of constant finite group schemes. Over bases with positive characteristic or more arithmetic structure, additional isomorphism types exist. For example, if 2 is invertible over the base, all group schemes of order 2 are constant, but over the 2-adic integers, μ_{2} is non-constant, because the special fiber isn't smooth. There exist sequences of highly ramified 2-adic rings over which the number of isomorphism types of group schemes of order 2 grows arbitrarily large. More detailed analysis of commutative finite flat group schemes over p-adic rings can be found in Raynaud's work on prolongations.

Commutative finite flat group schemes often occur in nature as subgroup schemes of abelian and semi-abelian varieties, and in positive or mixed characteristic, they can capture a lot of information about the ambient variety. For example, the p-torsion of an elliptic curve in characteristic zero is locally isomorphic to the constant elementary abelian group scheme of order p^{2}, but over F_{p}, it is a finite flat group scheme of order p^{2} that has either p connected components (if the curve is ordinary) or one connected component (if the curve is supersingular). If we consider a family of elliptic curves, the p-torsion forms a finite flat group scheme over the parametrizing space, and the supersingular locus is where the fibers are connected. This merging of connected components can be studied in fine detail by passing from a modular scheme to a rigid analytic space, where supersingular points are replaced by discs of positive radius.

== Cartier duality ==
Cartier duality is a scheme-theoretic analogue of Pontryagin duality taking finite commutative group schemes to finite commutative group schemes.

== Dieudonné modules ==
Finite flat commutative group schemes over a perfect field k of positive characteristic p can be studied by transferring their geometric structure to a (semi-)linear-algebraic setting. The basic object is the Dieudonné ring D = W(k){F,V}/(FV − p), which is a quotient of the ring of noncommutative polynomials, with coefficients in Witt vectors of k. F and V are the Frobenius and Verschiebung operators, and they may act nontrivially on the Witt vectors. Dieudonne and Cartier constructed an antiequivalence of categories between finite commutative group schemes over k of order a power of "p" and modules over D with finite W(k)-length. The Dieudonné module functor in one direction is given by homomorphisms into the abelian sheaf CW of Witt co-vectors. This sheaf is more or less dual to the sheaf of Witt vectors (which is in fact representable by a group scheme), since it is constructed by taking a direct limit of finite length Witt vectors under successive Verschiebung maps V: W_{n} → W_{n+1}, and then completing. Many properties of commutative group schemes can be seen by examining the corresponding Dieudonné modules, e.g., connected p-group schemes correspond to D-modules for which F is nilpotent, and étale group schemes correspond to modules for which F is an isomorphism.

Dieudonné theory exists in a somewhat more general setting than finite flat groups over a field. Oda's 1967 thesis gave a connection between Dieudonné modules and the first de Rham cohomology of abelian varieties, and at about the same time, Grothendieck suggested that there should be a crystalline version of the theory that could be used to analyze p-divisible groups. Galois actions on the group schemes transfer through the equivalences of categories, and the associated deformation theory of Galois representations was used in Wiles's work on the Shimura–Taniyama conjecture.

== See also ==
- Fundamental group scheme
- Geometric invariant theory
- GIT quotient
- Groupoid scheme
- Group-scheme action
- Group-stack
- Invariant theory
- Quotient stack
