= Automorphism group =

Mathematical group formed from the automorphisms of an object

In mathematics, the automorphism group of an object X is the group consisting of automorphisms of X under composition of morphisms. For example, if X is a finite-dimensional vector space, then the automorphism group of X is the group of invertible linear transformations from X to itself (the general linear group of X). If instead X is a group, then its automorphism group $\operatorname{Aut}(X)$ is the group consisting of all group automorphisms of X.

Especially in geometric contexts, an automorphism group is also called a symmetry group. A subgroup of an automorphism group is sometimes called a transformation group.

Automorphism groups are studied in a general way in the field of category theory.

== Examples ==
If X is a set with no additional structure, then any bijection from X to itself is an automorphism, and hence the automorphism group of X in this case is precisely the symmetric group of X. If the set X has additional structure, then it may be the case that not all bijections on the set preserve this structure, in which case the automorphism group will be a subgroup of the symmetric group on X. Some examples of this include the following:

- The automorphism group of a field extension $L/K$ is the group consisting of field automorphisms of L that fix K. If the field extension is Galois, the automorphism group is called the Galois group of the field extension.
- The automorphism group of the projective n-space over a field k is the projective linear group $\operatorname{PGL}_n(k).$
- The automorphism group $G$ of a finite cyclic group of order n is isomorphic to $(\mathbb{Z}/n\mathbb{Z})^\times$, the multiplicative group of integers modulo n, with the isomorphism given by $\overline{a} \mapsto \sigma_a \in G, \, \sigma_a(x) = x^a$. In particular, $G$ is an abelian group.
- The automorphism group of a finite-dimensional real Lie algebra $\mathfrak{g}$ has the structure of a (real) Lie group (in fact, it is even a linear algebraic group: see below). If G is a Lie group with Lie algebra $\mathfrak{g}$, then the automorphism group of G has a structure of a Lie group induced from that on the automorphism group of $\mathfrak{g}$. (Note: First, if G is simply connected, the automorphism group of G is that of $\mathfrak{g}$. Second, every connected Lie group is of the form $\widetilde{G}/C$ where $\widetilde{G}$ is a simply connected Lie group and C is a central subgroup and the automorphism group of G is the automorphism group of $G$ that preserves C. Third, by convention, a Lie group is second countable and has at most coutably many connected components; thus, the general case reduces to the connected case.)

If G is a group acting on a set X, the action amounts to a group homomorphism from G to the automorphism group of X and conversely. Indeed, each left G-action on a set X determines $G \to \operatorname{Aut}(X), \, g \mapsto \sigma_g, \, \sigma_g(x) = g \cdot x$, and, conversely, each homomorphism $\varphi: G \to \operatorname{Aut}(X)$ defines an action by $g \cdot x = \varphi(g)x$. This extends to the case when the set X has more structure than just a set. For example, if X is a vector space, then a group action of G on X is a group representation of the group G, representing G as a group of linear transformations (automorphisms) of X; these representations are the main object of study in the field of representation theory.

Here are some other facts about automorphism groups:

- Let $A, B$ be two finite sets of the same cardinality and $\operatorname{Iso}(A, B)$ the set of all bijections $A \mathrel{\overset{\sim}\to} B$. Then $\operatorname{Aut}(B)$, which is a symmetric group (see above), acts on $\operatorname{Iso}(A, B)$ from the left freely and transitively; that is to say, $\operatorname{Iso}(A, B)$ is a torsor for $\operatorname{Aut}(B)$ (cf. #In category theory).
- Let P be a finitely generated projective module over a ring R. Then there is an embedding $\operatorname{Aut}(P) \hookrightarrow \operatorname{GL}_n(R)$, unique up to inner automorphisms.

== In category theory ==
Automorphism groups appear very naturally in category theory.

If X is an object in a category, then the automorphism group of X is the group consisting of all the invertible morphisms from X to itself. It is the unit group of the endomorphism monoid of X. (For some examples, see PROP.)

If $A, B$ are objects in some category, then the set $\operatorname{Iso}(A, B)$ of all $A \mathrel{\overset{\sim}\to} B$ is a left $\operatorname{Aut}(B)$-torsor. In practical terms, this says that a different choice of a base point of $\operatorname{Iso}(A, B)$ differs unambiguously by an element of $\operatorname{Aut}(B)$, or that each choice of a base point is precisely a choice of a trivialization of the torsor.

If $X_1$ and $X_2$ are objects in categories $C_1$ and $C_2$, and if $F: C_1 \to C_2$ is a functor mapping $X_1$ to $X_2$, then $F$ induces a group homomorphism $\operatorname{Aut}(X_1) \to \operatorname{Aut}(X_2)$, as it maps invertible morphisms to invertible morphisms.

In particular, if G is a group viewed as a category with a single object * or, more generally, if G is a groupoid, then each functor $F: G \to C$, C a category, is called an action or a representation of G on the object $F(*)$, or the objects $F(\operatorname{Obj}(G))$. Those objects are then said to be $G$-objects (as they are acted by $G$); cf. $\mathbb{S}$-object. If $C$ is a module category like the category of finite-dimensional vector spaces, then $G$-objects are also called $G$-modules.

== Automorphism group functor ==
Let $M$ be a finite-dimensional vector space over a field k that is equipped with some algebraic structure (that is, M is a finite-dimensional algebra over k). It can be, for example, an associative algebra or a Lie algebra.

Now, consider k-linear maps $M \to M$ that preserve the algebraic structure: they form a vector subspace $\operatorname{End}_{\text{alg}}(M)$ of $\operatorname{End}(M)$. The unit group of $\operatorname{End}_{\text{alg}}(M)$ is the automorphism group $\operatorname{Aut}(M)$. When a basis on M is chosen, $\operatorname{End}(M)$ is the space of square matrices and $\operatorname{End}_{\text{alg}}(M)$ is the zero set of some polynomial equations, and the invertibility is again described by polynomials. Hence, $\operatorname{Aut}(M)$ is a linear algebraic group over k.

Now base extensions applied to the above discussion determines a functor: namely, for each commutative ring R over k, consider the R-linear maps $M \otimes R \to M \otimes R$ preserving the algebraic structure: denote it by $\operatorname{End}_{\text{alg}}(M \otimes R)$. Then the unit group of the matrix ring $\operatorname{End}_{\text{alg}}(M \otimes R)$ over R is the automorphism group $\operatorname{Aut}(M \otimes R)$ and $R \mapsto \operatorname{Aut}(M \otimes R)$ is a group functor: a functor from the category of commutative rings over k to the category of groups. Even better, it is represented by a scheme (since the automorphism groups are defined by polynomials): this scheme is called the automorphism group scheme and is denoted by $\operatorname{Aut}(M)$.

In general, however, an automorphism group functor may not be represented by a scheme.

== See also ==
- Outer automorphism group
- Level structure, a technique to remove an automorphism group
- Holonomy group
