= Étale morphism =

Concept in algebraic geometry

In algebraic geometry, an étale morphism (French: [etal]) is a morphism of schemes that is formally étale and locally of finite presentation; the étale morphism is connected to the concept of étale covering. This is an algebraic analogue of the notion of a local isomorphism in the complex analytic topology.

They satisfy the hypotheses of the implicit function theorem, but because open sets in the Zariski topology are so large, they are not necessarily local isomorphisms. Despite this, étale maps retain many of the properties of local analytic isomorphisms, and are useful in defining the algebraic fundamental group and the étale topology.

The word étale is a French adjective, which means "slack", as in "slack tide", or, figuratively, calm, immobile, something left to settle.

== Definition ==
Let $\phi : R \to S$ be a ring homomorphism. This makes $S$ an $R$-algebra. Choose a monic polynomial $f$ in $R[x]$ and a polynomial $g$ in $R[x]$ such that the derivative $f'$ of $f$ is a unit in $(R[x]/fR[x])_g$. We say that $\phi$ is standard étale if $f$ and $g$ can be chosen so that $S$ is isomorphic as an $R$-algebra to $(R[x]/fR[x])_g$ and $\phi$ is the canonical map.

Let $f : X \to Y$ be a morphism of schemes. We say that $f$ is étale if it has any of the following equivalent properties:

1. $f$ is flat and unramified.
2. $f$ is a smooth morphism and unramified.
3. $f$ is flat, locally of finite presentation, and for every $y$ in $Y$, the fiber $f^{-1}(y)$ is the disjoint union of points, each of which is the spectrum of a finite separable field extension of the residue field $\kappa(y)$.
4. $f$ is flat, locally of finite presentation, and for every $y$ in $Y$ and every algebraic closure $k'$ of the residue field $\kappa(y)$, the geometric fiber $f^{-1}(y) \otimes_{\kappa(y)} k'$ is the disjoint union of points, each of which is isomorphic to $\mbox{Spec } k'$.
5. $f$ is a smooth morphism of relative dimension zero.
6. $f$ is a smooth morphism and a locally quasi-finite morphism.
7. $f$ is locally of finite presentation and is locally a standard étale morphism, that is,
  For every $x$ in $X$, let $y = f(x)$. Then there is an open affine neighborhood $\operatorname{Spec} R$ of $y$ and an open affine neighborhood $\operatorname{Spec} S$ of $x$ such that $f(\operatorname{Spec} S)$ is contained in $\operatorname{Spec} R$ and such that the ring homomorphism $R \rightarrow S$ induced by $f$ is standard étale.
8. $f$ is locally of finite presentation and is formally étale.
9. $f$ is locally of finite presentation and is formally étale for maps from local rings, that is:
  Let $A$ be a local ring and $J$ be an ideal of $A$ such that $J^2=0$. Set $Z=\operatorname{Spec}A$ and $Z_0 = \operatorname{Spec} A/J$, and let $i \colon Z_0 \rightarrow Z$ be the canonical closed immersion. Let $z$ denote the closed point of $Z_0$. Let $h \colon Z \rightarrow Y$ and $g_0 \colon Z_0 \rightarrow X$ be morphisms such that $f(g_0(z)) = h(i(z))$. Then there exists a unique $Y$-morphism $g \colon Z \rightarrow X$ such that $gi = g_0$.

Assume that $Y$ is locally noetherian and f is locally of finite type. For $x$ in $X$, let $y = f(x)$ and let $\hat{\mathcal O}_{Y,y} \to \hat{\mathcal O}_{X,x}$ be the induced map on completed local rings. Then the following are equivalent:

1. $f$ is étale.
2. For every $x$ in $X$, the induced map on completed local rings is formally étale for the adic topology.
3. For every $x$ in $X$, $\hat{\mathcal O}_{X,x}$ is a free $\hat{\mathcal O}_{Y,y}$-module and the fiber $\hat{\mathcal O}_{X,x}/m_y\hat{\mathcal O}_{X,x}$ is a field which is a finite separable field extension of the residue field $\kappa(y)$. (Here $m_y$ is the maximal ideal of $\hat{\mathcal O}_{Y,y}$.)
4. $f$ is formally étale for maps of local rings with the following additional properties. The local ring $A$ may be assumed Artinian. If $m$ is the maximal ideal of $A$, then $J$ may be assumed to satisfy $mJ = 0$. Finally, the morphism on residue fields $\kappa(y) \rightarrow A/m$ may be assumed to be an isomorphism.

If in addition all the maps on residue fields $\kappa(y) \to \kappa(x)$ are isomorphisms, or if $\kappa(y)$ is separably closed, then $f$ is étale if and only if for every $x$ in $X$, the induced map on completed local rings is an isomorphism.

== Examples ==
Any open immersion is étale because it is locally an isomorphism.

Covering spaces form examples of étale morphisms. For example, if $d \geq 1$ is an integer invertible in the ring $R$ then

$$\text{Spec}(R[t,t^{-1},y]/(y^d - t)) \to \text{Spec}(R[t,t^{-1}])$$

is a degree $d$ étale morphism.

Any ramified covering $\pi:X \to Y$ has an unramified locus

$$\pi: X_{un} \to Y_{un}$$

which is étale.

Morphisms

$$\text{Spec}(L) \to \text{Spec}(K)$$

induced by finite separable field extensions are étale — they form arithmetic covering spaces with group of deck transformations given by $\text{Gal}(L/K)$.

Any ring homomorphism of the form $R \to S=R[x_1,\ldots,x_n]_g/(f_1,\ldots, f_n)$, where all the $f_i$ are polynomials, and where the Jacobian determinant $\det(\partial f_i/\partial x_j)$ is a unit in $S$, is étale. For example the morphism $\mathbb{C}[t,t^{-1}] \to \mathbb{C}[x,t,t^{-1}]/(x^n - t)$ is etale and corresponds to a degree $n$ covering space of $\mathbb{G}_m \in Sch/\mathbb{C}$ with the group $\mathbb{Z}/n$ of deck transformations.

Expanding upon the previous example, suppose that we have a morphism $f$ of smooth complex algebraic varieties. Since $f$ is given by equations, we can interpret it as a map of complex manifolds. Whenever the Jacobian of $f$ is nonzero, $f$ is a local isomorphism of complex manifolds by the implicit function theorem. By the previous example, having non-zero Jacobian is the same as being étale.

Let $f : X\to Y$ be a dominant morphism of finite type with X, Y locally noetherian, irreducible and Y normal. If f is unramified, then it is étale.

For a field K, any K-algebra A is necessarily flat. Therefore, A is an etale algebra if and only if it is unramified, which is also equivalent to

$$A \otimes_{K}\bar{K}\cong\bar{K}\oplus ...\oplus\bar{K},$$

where $\bar K$ is the separable closure of the field K and the right hand side is a finite direct sum, all of whose summands are $\bar K$. This characterization of etale K-algebras is a stepping stone in reinterpreting classical Galois theory (see Grothendieck's Galois theory).

== Properties ==
- Étale morphisms are preserved under composition and base change.
- Étale morphisms are local on the source and on the base. In other words, $f: X\to Y$ is étale if and only if for each covering of $X$ by open subschemes the restriction of $f$ to each of the open subschemes of the covering is étale, and also if and only if for each cover of $Y$ by open subschemes the induced morphisms $f_{(U)} : X \times_Y U \to U$ is étale for each subscheme $U$ of the covering. In particular, it is possible to test the property of being étale on open affines $V=\operatorname{Spec}(B)\to U=\operatorname{Spec}(A)$.
- The product of a finite family of étale morphisms is étale.
- Given a finite family of morphisms $\{f_\alpha : X_\alpha \to Y\}$, the disjoint union $\coprod f_\alpha : \coprod X_\alpha \to Y$ is étale if and only if each $f_\alpha$ is étale.
- Let $f : X \to Y$ and $g : Y \to Z$, and assume that $g$ is unramified and $gf$ is étale. Then $f$ is étale. In particular, if $X$ and $X'$ are étale over $Y$, then any $Y$-morphism between $X$ and $X'$ is étale.
- Quasi-compact étale morphisms are quasi-finite.
- A morphism $f : X \to Y$ is an open immersion if and only if it is étale and radicial.
- If $f : X \to Y$ is étale and surjective, then $\dim X = \dim Y$ (finite or otherwise).

== Inverse function theorem ==
Étale morphisms

f: X → Y

are the algebraic counterpart of local diffeomorphisms. More precisely, a morphism between smooth varieties is étale at a point iff the differential between the corresponding tangent spaces is an isomorphism. This is in turn precisely the condition needed to ensure that a map between manifolds is a local diffeomorphism, i.e. for any point y ∈ Y, there is an open neighborhood U of x such that the restriction of f to U is a diffeomorphism. This conclusion does not hold in algebraic geometry, because the topology is too coarse. For example, consider the projection f of the parabola

y = x^{2}

to the y-axis. This morphism is étale at every point except the origin (0, 0), because the differential is given by 2x, which does not vanish at these points.

However, there is no (Zariski-)local inverse of f, just because the square root is not an algebraic map, not being given by polynomials. However, there is a remedy for this situation, using the étale topology. The precise statement is as follows: if $f : X\to Y$ is étale and finite, then for any point y lying in Y, there is an étale morphism V → Y containing y in its image (V can be thought of as an étale open neighborhood of y), such that when we base change f to V, then $X\times_Y V\to V$ (the first member would be the pre-image of V by f if V were a Zariski open neighborhood) is a finite disjoint union of open subsets isomorphic to V. In other words, étale-locally in Y, the morphism f is a topological finite cover.

For a smooth morphism $f : X\to Y$ of relative dimension n, étale-locally in X and in Y, f is an open immersion into an affine space $\mathbb A^n_Y$. This is the étale analogue version of the structure theorem on submersions.

== See also ==
- Purity (algebraic geometry)

== Bibliography ==
- Hartshorne, Robin (1977), Algebraic Geometry, Berlin, New York: Springer-Verlag, ISBN 978-0-387-90244-9, MR 0463157
- Grothendieck, Alexandre; Jean Dieudonné (1964), "Éléments de géométrie algébrique (rédigés avec la collaboration de Jean Dieudonné) : IV. Étude locale des schémas et des morphismes de schémas, Première partie", Publications Mathématiques de l'IHÉS, 20: 5–259, doi:10.1007/bf02684747, S2CID 118147570
- Grothendieck, Alexandre; Dieudonné, Jean (1964), "Éléments de géométrie algébrique (rédigés avec la collaboration de Jean Dieudonné) : IV. Étude locale des schémas et des morphismes de schémas, Première partie", Publications Mathématiques de l'IHÉS, 20: 5–259, doi:10.1007/bf02684747, S2CID 118147570
- Grothendieck, Alexandre; Dieudonné, Jean (1967), "Éléments de géométrie algébrique (rédigés avec la collaboration de Jean Dieudonné) : IV. Étude locale des schémas et des morphismes de schémas, Quatrième partie", Publications Mathématiques de l'IHÉS, 32: 5–333, doi:10.1007/BF02732123, S2CID 189794756
- Grothendieck, Alexandre; Raynaud, Michèle (2003) [1971], Séminaire de Géométrie Algébrique du Bois Marie - 1960-61 - Revêtements étales et groupe fondamental - (SGA 1) (Documents Mathématiques 3), Paris: Société Mathématique de France, xviii+327, arXiv:math.AG/0206203, ISBN 978-2-85629-141-2
- J. S. Milne (1980), Étale cohomology, Princeton, N.J: Princeton University Press, ISBN 0-691-08238-3
- J. S. Milne (2008). Lectures on Etale Cohomology
