= Fpqc morphism =

Faithfully flat morphism of schemes

In algebraic geometry, there are two slightly different definitions of an fpqc morphism, both variations of faithfully flat morphisms of schemes.

Sometimes an fpqc morphism means one that is faithfully flat and quasi-compact. This is where the abbreviation fpqc comes from: fpqc stands for the French phrase "fidèlement plat et quasi-compacte", meaning "faithfully flat and quasi-compact".

However, it is more common to define an fpqc morphism $f: X \to Y$ of schemes to be a faithfully flat morphism that satisfies the following equivalent conditions:

1. Every quasi-compact open subset of $Y$ is the image of a quasi-compact open subset of $X$.
2. There exists a covering $V_i$ of $Y$ by open affine subschemes such that each $V_i$ is the image of a quasi-compact open subset of $X$.
3. Each point $x \in X$ has a neighborhood $U$ such that $f(U)$ is open and $f: U \to f(U)$ is quasi-compact.
4. Each point $x \in X$ has a quasi-compact neighborhood $U$ such that $f(U)$ is open affine.

Examples: An open faithfully flat morphism is fpqc.

An fpqc morphism satisfies the following properties:

- The composite of fpqc morphisms is fpqc.
- A base change of an fpqc morphism is fpqc.
- If $f: X \to Y$ is a morphism of schemes and if there is an open covering $V_i$ of $Y$ such that the $f: f^{-1}(V_i) \to V_i$ is fpqc, then $f$ is fpqc.
- A faithfully flat morphism that is locally of finite presentation (i.e., fppf) is fpqc.
- If $f:X \to Y$ is an fpqc morphism, a subset of $Y$ is open in $Y$ if and only if its inverse image under $f$ is open in $X$.

== See also ==
- Flat topology
- fppf morphism
