= Locally acyclic morphism =

In algebraic geometry, a morphism $f: X \to S$ of schemes is said to be locally acyclic if, roughly, any sheaf on S and its restriction to X through f have the same étale cohomology, locally. For example, a smooth morphism is universally locally acyclic.
