= Frobenius splitting =

Concept in algebraic geometry

In algebraic geometry, a Frobenius splitting, introduced by Mehta and Ramanathan, is a splitting of the injective morphism $\mathcal{O}_X\to F_*\mathcal{O}_X$ from a structure sheaf $\mathcal{O}_X$ of a characteristic $p>0$ variety $X$ to its image $F_*\mathcal{O}_X$ under the Frobenius endomorphism $F_*$.

Brion and Kumar give a detailed discussion of Frobenius splittings.

A fundamental property of Frobenius-split projective schemes $X$ is that the higher cohomology $H^i(X,L)$ ($i>0$) of ample line bundles $L$ vanishes.
