= Diagonalizable group =

In mathematics, an affine algebraic group is said to be diagonalizable if it is isomorphic to a subgroup of D_{n}, the group of diagonal matrices. A diagonalizable group defined over a field k is said to split over k or k-split if the isomorphism is defined over k. This coincides with the usual notion of split for an algebraic group. Every diagonalizable group splits over the separable closure k_{s} of k. Any closed subgroup and image of diagonalizable groups are diagonalizable. The torsion subgroup of a diagonalizable group is dense.

The category of diagonalizable groups defined over k is equivalent to the category of finitely generated abelian groups with Gal(k_{s}/k)-equivariant morphisms without p-torsion, if k is of characteristic p. This is an analog of Poincaré duality and motivated the terminology.

A diagonalizable k-group is said to be anisotropic if it has no nontrivial k-valued character.

The so-called "rigidity" states that the identity component of the centralizer of a diagonalizable group coincides with the identity component of the normalizer of the group. The fact plays a crucial role in the structure theory of solvable groups.

A connected diagonalizable group is called an algebraic torus (which is not necessarily compact, in contrast to a complex torus). A k-torus is a torus defined over k. The centralizer of a maximal torus is called a Cartan subgroup.

== See also ==
- Diagonal subgroup
