= Quasi-finite morphism =

Type of morphism in algebraic geometry

In algebraic geometry, a branch of mathematics, a morphism f : X → Y of schemes is quasi-finite if it is of finite type and satisfies any of the following equivalent conditions:

- Every point x of X is isolated in its fiber f^{−1}(f(x)). In other words, every fiber is a discrete (hence finite) set.
- For every point x of X, the scheme f^{−1}(f(x)) = X ×_{Y}Spec κ(f(x)) is a finite κ(f(x))-scheme. (Here κ(p) is the residue field at a point p.)
- For every point x of X, $\mathcal{O}_{X,x}\otimes \kappa(f(x))$ is finitely generated over $\kappa(f(x))$.

Quasi-finite morphisms were originally defined by Alexander Grothendieck in SGA 1 and did not include the finite type hypothesis. This hypothesis was added to the definition in EGA II 6.2 because it makes it possible to give an algebraic characterization of quasi-finiteness in terms of stalks.

For a general morphism f : X → Y and a point x in X, f is said to be quasi-finite at x if there exist open affine neighborhoods U of x and V of f(x) such that f(U) is contained in V and such that the restriction f : U → V is quasi-finite. f is locally quasi-finite if it is quasi-finite at every point in X. A quasi-compact locally quasi-finite morphism is quasi-finite.

== Properties ==
For a morphism f, the following properties are true.

- If f is quasi-finite, then the induced map f_{red} between reduced schemes is quasi-finite.
- If f is a closed immersion, then f is quasi-finite.
- If X is noetherian and f is an immersion, then f is quasi-finite.
- If g : Y → Z, and if g ∘ f is quasi-finite, then f is quasi-finite if any of the following are true:
  1. g is separated,
  2. X is noetherian,
  3. X ×_{Z} Y is locally noetherian.

Quasi-finiteness is preserved by base change. The composite and fiber product of quasi-finite morphisms is quasi-finite.

If f is unramified at a point x, then f is quasi-finite at x. Conversely, if f is quasi-finite at x, and if also $\mathcal{O}_{f^{-1}(f(x)),x}$, the local ring of x in the fiber f^{−1}(f(x)), is a field and a finite separable extension of κ(f(x)), then f is unramified at x.

Finite morphisms are quasi-finite. A quasi-finite proper morphism locally of finite presentation is finite. Indeed, a morphism is finite if and only if it is proper and locally quasi-finite. Since proper morphisms are of finite type and finite type morphisms are quasi-compact one may omit the qualification locally, i.e., a morphism is finite if and only if it is proper and quasi-finite.

A generalized form of Zariski Main Theorem is the following: Suppose Y is quasi-compact and quasi-separated. Let f be quasi-finite, separated and of finite presentation. Then f factors as $X \hookrightarrow X' \to Y$ where the first morphism is an open immersion and the second is finite. (X is open in a finite scheme over Y.)

== See also ==
- The quasi-finite fundamental group scheme
