= Flat morphism =

Scheme theory concept

In mathematics, in particular in algebraic geometry, a flat morphism $f$ from a scheme $X$ to a scheme $Y$ is a morphism such that the induced map on every stalk is a flat map of rings, i.e.,

$$f_P : \mathcal{O}_{Y, f(P)} \to \mathcal{O}_{X, P}$$

is a flat map for all $P$ in $X$. A map of rings $A\to B$ is called flat if it is a homomorphism that makes $B$ a flat $A$-module. A morphism of schemes is called faithfully flat if it is both surjective and flat.

Two basic intuitions regarding flat morphisms are:

- flatness is a generic property; and
- the failure of flatness occurs on the jumping set of the morphism.

The first of these comes from commutative algebra: subject to some finiteness conditions on $f$, it can be shown that there is a non-empty open subscheme $Y'$ of $Y$ such that $f$ restricted to $Y'$ is a flat morphism (generic flatness). Here 'restriction' is interpreted by means of the fiber product of schemes, applied to $f$ and the inclusion map of $Y'$ into $Y$.

For the second, the idea is that morphisms in algebraic geometry can exhibit discontinuities of a kind that are detected by flatness. For instance, the operation of blowing down in the birational geometry of an algebraic surface can give a single fiber that is of dimension 1 when all the others have dimension 0. It turns out (retrospectively) that flatness in morphisms is directly related to controlling this sort of semicontinuity, or one-sided jumping.

Flat morphisms are used to define (more than one version of) the flat topos, and flat cohomology of sheaves from it. This is a deep-lying theory, and has not been found easy to handle. The concept of étale morphism (and so étale cohomology) depends on the flat morphism concept: an étale morphism being flat, of finite type, and unramified.

== Examples ==
Consider the affine scheme morphism

$$\operatorname{Spec} \left(\frac{\C[x,y,t]}{x^2 + y^2 - t}\right) \to \operatorname{Spec}(\C[t])$$

induced from the morphism of algebras

$$\begin{cases} \C[t] \to \frac{\C[x,y,t]}{x^2 + y^2 - t} \\ t \mapsto t. \\ \end{cases}$$

Since flatness of this morphism is equivalent to the vanishing of the Tor group

$$\operatorname{Tor}_1^{\C [t]}\left(\frac{\Complex [x,y,t]}{x^2 + y^2 -t}, \C \right),$$

we resolve the complex numbers

$$\begin{array}{lcccc}
0 & \to & \C[t] & \xrightarrow{\cdot t} & \C[t] & \to & 0 \\
\downarrow & & \downarrow & & \downarrow & & \downarrow\\
0 & \to & 0 & \to & \C & \to & 0 \\
\end{array}$$

and tensor by the module representing our scheme, giving the sequence of $\C[t]$-modules

$$0 \to \frac{\C[x,y,t]}{x^2 + y^2 - t} \xrightarrow{\cdot t} \frac{\C[x,y,t]}{x^2 + y^2 - t} \to 0.$$

Because $t$ is not a zero divisor, we have a trivial kernel and hence the homology group vanishes.

=== Miracle flatness ===
Other examples of flat morphisms can be found using "miracle flatness" which states that if a morphism $f : X \to Y$ between a Cohen–Macaulay scheme to a regular scheme has equidimensional fibers, then it is flat. Easy examples of this are elliptic fibrations, smooth morphisms, and morphisms to stratified varieties which satisfy miracle flatness on each of the strata.

=== Hilbert schemes ===
The universal examples of flat morphisms of schemes are given by Hilbert schemes. This is because Hilbert schemes parameterize universal classes of flat morphisms, and every flat morphism is the pullback from some Hilbert scheme. I.e., if $f : X\to S$ is flat, there exists a commutative diagram

$$\begin{matrix}
X & \to & \operatorname{Hilb}_{S} \\
\downarrow & & \downarrow \\
S & \to & S
\end{matrix}$$

for the Hilbert scheme of all flat morphisms to $S$. Since $f$ is flat, the fibers $f_s : X_s \to s$ all have the same Hilbert polynomial $\Phi$, so we could have similarly written $\text{Hilb}_S^\Phi$ for the Hilbert scheme above.

=== Non-examples ===
==== Blowup ====
One class of non-examples are given by blowup maps $\operatorname{Bl}_I X \to X$. One easy example is the blowup of a point in $\C[x,y]$. If we take the origin, this is given by the morphism

$$\C[x,y] \to \frac{\C[x,y,s,t]}{xt - ys}$$

sending $x \mapsto x$ and $y \mapsto y$, where the fiber over a point $(a,b) \neq (0,0)$ is a copy of $\C$, i.e.,

$$\frac{\C[x,y,s,t]}{xt - ys}\otimes_{\C[x,y]} \frac{\C[x,y]}{(x-a,y-b)} \cong \C,$$

which follows from

$$M\otimes_R \frac{R}{I} \cong \frac{M}{IM}.$$

However, for $a=b=0$, we get the isomorphism

$$\frac{\C[x,y,s,t]}{xt - ys}\otimes_{\C[x,y]} \frac{\C[x,y]}{(x,y)} \cong \C[s,t].$$

The reason this fails to be flat is because of the miracle flatness lemma, which can be checked locally.

==== Infinite resolution ====
A simple non-example of a flat morphism is $k[\varepsilon] = k[x]/(x^2) \to k$. This is because $k \otimes^\mathbf{L}_{k[\varepsilon]} k$ is an infinite complex, which we can find by taking a flat resolution of $k$,

$$\cdots ~\xrightarrow{\overset{} \cdot \varepsilon}~ k[\varepsilon] ~\xrightarrow{\cdot \varepsilon}~ k[\varepsilon] \xrightarrow{\cdot \varepsilon} k[\varepsilon] \to k,$$

and tensoring the resolution with $k$, which gives

$$k\otimes^\mathbf{L}_{k[\varepsilon]} k \simeq \bigoplus_{i=0}^\infty k[+I],$$

showing that the morphism cannot be flat. Another non-example of a flat morphism is a blowup since a flat morphism necessarily has equi-dimensional fibers.

== Properties of flat morphisms ==
Let $f : X \to Y$ be a morphism of schemes. For a morphism $g : Y' \to Y$, let $X' = X\times_{Y} Y'$ and $f' = (f, 1_{Y'}) : X' \to Y'$. The morphism f is flat if and only if for every g, the pullback $f'^*$ is an exact functor from the category of quasi-coherent $\mathcal{O}_{Y'}$-modules to the category of quasi-coherent $\mathcal{O}_{X'}$-modules.

Assume $f : X \to Y$ and $g : Y \to Z$ are morphisms of schemes and f is flat at x in X. Then g is flat at $f(x)$ if and only if gf is flat at x. In particular, if f is faithfully flat, then g is flat or faithfully flat if and only if gf is flat or faithfully flat, respectively.

=== Fundamental properties ===
- The composite of two flat morphisms is flat.
- The fiber product of two flat or faithfully flat morphisms is a flat or faithfully flat morphism, respectively.
- Flatness and faithful flatness is preserved by base change: If f is flat or faithfully flat and $g : Y' \to Y$, then the fiber product $f\times g : X\times_Y Y' \to Y'$ is flat or faithfully flat, respectively.
- The set of points where a morphism (locally of finite presentation) is flat is open.
- If f is faithfully flat and of finite presentation, and if gf is finite type or finite presentation, then g is of finite type or finite presentation, respectively.

Suppose $f : X \to Y$ is a flat morphism of schemes.

- If F is a quasi-coherent sheaf of finite presentation on Y (in particular, if F is coherent), and if J is the annihilator of F on Y, then $f^*J \to \mathcal{O}_X$, the pullback of the inclusion map, is an injection, and the image of $f^*J$ in $\mathcal{O}_X$ is the annihilator of $f^*F$ on X.
- If f is faithfully flat and if G is a quasi-coherent $\mathcal{O}_Y$-module, then the pullback map on global sections $\Gamma(Y, G) \to \Gamma(X, f^*G)$ is injective.

Suppose $h : S' \to S$ is flat. Let X and Y be S-schemes, and let $X'$ and $Y'$ be their base change by h.

- If $f : X \to Y$ is quasi-compact and dominant, then its base change $f' : X' \to Y'$ is quasi-compact and dominant.
- If h is faithfully flat, then the pullback map $\operatorname{Hom}_S(X,Y) \to \operatorname{Hom}_{S'}(X',Y')$ is injective.
- Assume $f : X \to Y$ is quasi-compact and quasi-separated. Let Z be the closed image of X, and let $j : Z \to Y$ be the canonical injection. Then the closed subscheme determined by the base change $j' : Z' \to Y'$ is the closed image of $X'$.

=== Topological properties ===
If $f : X \to Y$ is flat, then it possesses all of the following properties:

- For every point x of X and every generization y′ of y = f(x), there is a generization x′ of x such that y′ = f(x′).
- For every point x of X, $f(\operatorname{Spec} \mathcal{O}_{X,x}) = \operatorname{Spec} \mathcal{O}_{Y,f(x)}$.
- For every irreducible closed subset Y′ of Y, every irreducible component of f^{−1}(Y′) dominates Y′.
- If Z and Z′ are two irreducible closed subsets of Y with Z contained in Z′, then for every irreducible component T of f^{−1}(Z), there is an irreducible component T′ of f^{−1}(Z′) containing T.
- For every irreducible component T of X, the closure of f(T) is an irreducible component of Y.
- If Y is irreducible with generic point y, and if f^{−1}(y) is irreducible, then X is irreducible.
- If f is also closed, the image of every connected component of X is a connected component of Y.
- For every pro-constructible subset Z of Y, $f^{-1}(\overline{Z}) = \overline{f^{-1}(Z)}$.

If f is flat and locally of finite presentation, then f is universally open. However, if f is faithfully flat and quasi-compact, it is not in general true that f is open, even if X and Y are noetherian. Furthermore, no converse to this statement holds: If f is the canonical map from the reduced scheme X_{red} to X, then f is a universal homeomorphism, but for X non-reduced and noetherian, f is never flat.

If $f : X \to Y$ is faithfully flat and quasicompact, then:

- The topology on Y is the quotient topology relative to f.
- If Z is a subset of Y, then Z is a locally closed pro-constructible subset of Y if and only if f^{−1}(Z) is a locally closed pro-constructible subset of X.

If f is flat and locally of finite presentation, then for each of the following properties P, the set of points where f has P is open:

- Serre's condition S_{k} (for any fixed k).
- Geometrically regular.
- Geometrically normal.

If in addition f is proper, then the same is true for each of the following properties:

- Geometrically reduced.
- Geometrically reduced and having k geometric connected components (for any fixed k).
- Geometrically integral.

=== Flatness and dimension ===
Assume X and Y are locally noetherian, and let $f : X \to Y$.

- Let $x$ be a point of $X$ and $y=f(x)$. If $f$ is flat, then $\dim_{x}X=\dim_{y}Y+\dim_{x}f^{-1}(y)$. Conversely, if this equality holds for all x, X is Cohen–Macaulay, and Y is regular, and furthermore f maps closed points to closed points, then f is flat.
- If f is faithfully flat, then for each closed subset Z of Y, codim_{Y}(Z) = codim_{X}(f^{−1}(Z)).
- Suppose f is flat and F is a quasi-coherent module over Y. If F has projective dimension at most n, then $f^*F$ has projective dimension at most n.

=== Descent properties ===
- Assume f is flat at x in X. If X is reduced or normal at x, then Y is reduced or normal, respectively, at f(x). Conversely, if f is also of finite presentation and f^{−1}(y) is reduced or normal, respectively, at x, then X is reduced or normal, respectively, at x.
- In particular, if f is faithfully flat, then X reduced or normal implies that Y is reduced or normal, respectively. If f is faithfully flat and of finite presentation, then all the fibers of f reduced or normal implies that X is reduced or normal, respectively.
- If f is flat at x in X, and if X is integral or integrally closed at x, then Y is integral or integrally closed, respectively, at f(x).
- If f is faithfully flat, X is locally integral, and the topological space of Y is locally noetherian, then Y is locally integral.
- If f is faithfully flat and quasi-compact, and if X is locally noetherian, then Y is also locally noetherian.
- Assume f is flat and X and Y are locally noetherian. If X is regular at x, then Y is regular at f(x). Conversely, if Y is regular at f(x) and f^{−1}(f(x)) is regular at x, then X is regular at x.
- Assume f is flat and X and Y are locally noetherian. If X is normal at x, then Y is normal at f(x). Conversely, if Y is normal at f(x) and f^{−1}(f(x)) is normal at x, then X is normal at x.

Let $g : Y' \to Y$ be faithfully flat. Let F be a quasi-coherent sheaf on Y, and let F′ be the pullback of F to Y′. Then F is flat over Y if and only if F′ is flat over Y′.

Assume f is faithfully flat and quasi-compact. Let G be a quasi-coherent sheaf on Y, and let F denote its pullback to X. Then F is finite type, finite presentation, or locally free of rank n if and only if G has the corresponding property.

Suppose $f : X \to Y$ is an S-morphism of S-schemes. Let $g : S' \to S$ be faithfully flat and quasi-compact, and let X′, Y′, and f′ denote the base changes by g. Then for each of the following properties P, if f′ has P, then f has P.

- Open.
- Closed.
- Quasi-compact and a homeomorphism onto its image.
- A homeomorphism.

Additionally, for each of the following properties P, f has P if and only if f′ has P.

- Universally open.
- Universally closed.
- A universal homeomorphism.
- Quasi-compact.
- Quasi-compact and dominant.
- Quasi-compact and universally bicontinuous.
- Separated.
- Quasi-separated.
- Locally of finite type.
- Locally of finite presentation.
- Finite type.
- Finite presentation.
- Proper.
- An isomorphism.
- A monomorphism.
- An open immersion.
- A quasi-compact immersion.
- A closed immersion.
- Affine.
- Quasi-affine.
- Finite.
- Quasi-finite.
- Integral.

It is possible for f′ to be a local isomorphism without f being even a local immersion.

If f is quasi-compact and L is an invertible sheaf on X, then L is f-ample or f-very ample if and only if its pullback L′ is f′-ample or f′-very ample, respectively. However, it is not true that f is projective if and only if f′ is projective. It is not even true that if f is proper and f′ is projective, then f is quasi-projective, because it is possible to have an f′-ample sheaf on X′ which does not descend to X.

== See also ==
- fpqc morphism
- Relative effective Cartier divisor, an example of a flat morphism
- Degeneration (algebraic geometry)
