= Madhav V. Nori =

Indian mathematician

Madhav Nori
- Citizenship: Indian
- Education: University of Mumbai
- Scientific career
- Workplaces: University of Chicago
- Thesis: The fundamental group-scheme (1981)

Madhav Vithal Nori is an Indian mathematician. In 1980 he has received the INSA Medal for Young Scientists.

== Career ==
Nori was awarded his PhD in mathematics in 1981 from the University of Mumbai. He studies within the fields of algebraic geometry and commutative algebra. His areas of interest in research focus on algebraic cycles, K-theory, Hodge theory, Galois theory, and their interactions. Nori received the INSA Medal for Young Scientists in 1980 and is an elected Fellow of the Indian Academy of Sciences, Bangalore.

== The fundamental group scheme ==
Under the direction of Conjeerveram S. Seshadri Nori proved the existence of the fundamental group scheme $\pi_1(X,x)$ during his PhD work, using the theory of essentially finite vector bundles that he defined. The fundamental group scheme is also known as Nori fundamental group scheme, taking the name by his creator, and often also denoted as $\pi^N(X,x)$, where $N$ stands for Nori. There is a special family of vector bundles called Nori-semistable vector bundles in Nori's honor as he had the first intuition for their existence and properties. His construction has been since then further generalized, for instance a proof of the existence of the fundamental group scheme for schemes defined over Dedekind schemes has been provided by Marco Antei, Michel Emsalem and Carlo Gasbarri.

== See also ==
- Nori motive (see https://ncatlab.org/nlab/show/Nori+motive)
