= Quasi-compact morphism =

In algebraic geometry, a morphism $f: X \to Y$ between schemes is said to be quasi-compact if Y can be covered by open affine subschemes $V_i$ such that the pre-images $f^{-1}(V_i)$ are compact. If f is quasi-compact, then the pre-image of a compact open subscheme (e.g., open affine subscheme) under f is compact.

It is not enough that Y admits a covering by compact open subschemes whose pre-images are compact. To give an example, let A be a ring that does not satisfy the ascending chain conditions on radical ideals, and put $X = \operatorname{Spec} A$. Then X contains an open subset U that is not compact. Let Y be the scheme obtained by gluing two X's along U. X, Y are both compact. If $f: X \to Y$ is the inclusion of one of the copies of X, then the pre-image of the other X, open affine in Y, is U—not compact. Hence, f is not quasi-compact.

A morphism from a quasi-compact scheme to an affine scheme is quasi-compact.

Let $f: X \to Y$ be a quasi-compact morphism between schemes. Then $f(X)$ is closed if and only if it is stable under specialization.

The composition of quasi-compact morphisms is quasi-compact. The base change of a quasi-compact morphism is quasi-compact.

An affine scheme is quasi-compact. In fact, a scheme is quasi-compact if and only if it is a finite union of open affine subschemes. Serre's criterion gives a necessary and sufficient condition for a quasi-compact scheme to be affine.

A quasi-compact scheme has at least one closed point.

== See also ==
- fpqc morphism
