= Artin–Schreier curve =

In mathematics, an Artin–Schreier curve is a plane curve defined over an algebraically closed field of characteristic $p$ by an equation

$$y^p - y = f(x)$$

for some rational function $f$ over that field.

One of the most important examples of such curves is hyperelliptic curves in characteristic 2, whose Jacobian varieties have been suggested for use in cryptography. It is common to write these curves in the form

$$y^2 + h(x) y = f(x)$$

for some polynomials $f$ and $h$.

== Definition ==
More generally, an Artin-Schreier curve defined over an algebraically closed field of characteristic $p$ is a branched covering

$$C \to \mathbb{P}^1$$

of the projective line of degree $p$. Such a cover is necessarily cyclic, that is, the Galois group of the corresponding algebraic function field extension is the cyclic group $\mathbb{Z}/p\mathbb{Z}$. In other words, $k(C)/k(x)$ is an Artin–Schreier extension.

The fundamental theorem of Artin–Schreier theory implies that such a curve defined over a field $k$ has an affine model

$$y^p - y = f(x)$$

for some rational function $f \in k(x)$ that is not equal to $z^p - z$ for any other rational function $z$. In other words, if for $z \in k(x)$ we define the rational function $g(z) = z^p - z$, then we require that $f \in k(x) \backslash g(k(x))$.

== Ramification ==
Let $C: y^p - y = f(x)$ be an Artin–Schreier curve. Rational function $f$ over an algebraically closed field $k$ has partial fraction decomposition

$$f(x) = f_\infty(x) + \sum_{\alpha \in B'} f_\alpha\left(\frac{1}{x-\alpha}\right)$$

for some finite set $B'$ of elements of $k$ and corresponding non-constant polynomials $f_\alpha$ defined over $k$, and (possibly constant) polynomial $f_\infty$. After a change of coordinates, $f$ can be chosen so that the above polynomials have degrees coprime to $p$, and the same either holds for $f_\infty$ or it is zero. If that is the case, we define

$$B = \begin{cases} B' &\text{ if } f_\infty = 0, \\ B'\cup\{\infty\} &\text{ otherwise.}\end{cases}$$

Then the set $B \subset \mathbb{P}^1(k)$ is precisely the set of branch points of the covering $C \to \mathbb{P}^1$.

For example, Artin–Schreier curve $y^p - y = f(x)$, where $f$ is a polynomial, is ramified at a single point over the projective line.

Since the degree of the cover is a prime number, over each branching point $\alpha \in B$ lies a single ramification point $P_\alpha$ with corresponding different exponent (not to confused with the ramification index) equal to

$$d(P_\alpha) = (p - 1)\big(\deg(f_\alpha) + 1\big) + 1.$$

== Genus ==
Since $p$ does not divide $\deg(f_\alpha)$, ramification indices $e(P_\alpha)$ are not divisible by $p$ either. Therefore, the Riemann–Roch theorem may be used to compute that the genus of an Artin–Schreier curve is given by

$$g = \frac{p-1}{2} \left( \sum_{\alpha\in B} \big(\deg(f_\alpha) + 1\big) - 2 \right).$$

For example, for a hyperelliptic curve defined over a field of characteristic $p = 2$ by equation $y^2 - y = f(x)$ with $f$ decomposed as above,

$$g = \sum_{\alpha\in B} \frac{\deg(f_\alpha) + 1}{2} - 1.$$

== Generalizations ==
Artin–Schreier curves are a particular case of plane curves defined over an algebraically closed field $k$ of characteristic $p$ by an equation

$$g(y^p) = f(x)$$

for some separable polynomial $g \in k[x]$ and rational function $f \in k(x) \backslash g(k(x))$. Mapping $(x, y) \mapsto x$ yields a covering map from the curve $C$ to the projective line $\mathbb{P}^1$. Separability of defining polynomial $g$ ensures separability of the corresponding function field extension $k(C)/k(x)$. If $g(y^p) = a_{m} y^{p^m} + a_{m - 1} y^{p^{m-1}} + \cdots + a_{1} y^p + a_0$, a change of variables can be found so that $a_m = a_1 = 1$ and $a_0 = 0$. It has been shown that such curves can be built via a sequence of Artin-Schreier extension, that is, there exists a sequence of cyclic coverings of curves

$$C \to C_{m-1} \to \cdots \to C_0 = \mathbb{P}^1,$$

each of degree $p$, starting with the projective line.

== See also ==
- Artin–Schreier theory
- Hyperelliptic curve
- Superelliptic curve
