= Lê Thị Thanh Nhàn =

Vietnamese mathematician (born 1970)

Lê Thị Thanh Nhàn (born March 23, 1970) is a Vietnamese mathematician who is a professor of mathematics and vice rector for the College of Science at Thái Nguyên University. Her research concerns commutative algebra and algebraic geometry.

== Biography ==
Nhàn's father was a soldier, who died when he was young, and her mother was a teacher. She was born in Thừa Thiên–Huế, and grew up in Thái Nguyên as the middle of five children in a poor family.

Planning to become a teacher herself, she studied mathematics at the Thái Nguyên College of Education from 1986 to 1990, earning a bachelor's degree, and on graduating became a lecturer in mathematics at the same institution. She continued her education at the Hanoi University of Education, earning a master's degree in 1995 and then at the Institute of Mathematics, Vietnam Academy of Sciences and Technology, earning her Ph.D. in 2001, under the joint supervision of Prof. Nguyen Tu Cuong and Marcel Morales of Joseph Fourier University.

She moved from the College of Education to the College of Science in 2002, and was promoted to associate professor in 2005, becoming the youngest mathematician in Vietnam with that rank. She has also been associated with the International Centre for Theoretical Physics in Italy as a junior associate member from 2002 to 2007 and as a regular associate member from 2009 to 2014. In 2009 she became vice rector.

Nhàn was promoted to mathematics professor in 2015, becoming the second female mathematics professor in Vietnam (The first Vietnamese female mathematics professor in Vietnam is professor Hoàng Xuân Sính)

== Awards and honors ==
In 2011, she was one of two winners of the Kovalevskaya Prize, an annual award to promote women in the sciences in Vietnam. The award is named after Russian mathematician Sofia Kovalevskaya and was established in 1985 by mathematician Neal Koblitz and his wife Ann Hibner Koblitz, based on the profits from Ann Koblitz' biography of Kovalevskaya.
