= Superelliptic curve =

In mathematics, a superelliptic curve is an algebraic curve defined by an equation of the form

$$y^m = f(x),$$

where $m \geq 2$ is an integer and f is a polynomial of degree $d\geq 3$ with coefficients in a field $k$; more precisely, it is the smooth projective curve whose function field defined by this equation. The case $m=2$ and $d=3, 4$ is an elliptic curve, the case $m=2$ and $d\ge 5$ is a hyperelliptic curve, and the case $m=3$ and $d\geq 4$ is an example of a trigonal curve.

Some authors impose additional restrictions, for example, that the integer $m$ should not be divisible by the characteristic of $k$, that the polynomial $f$ should be square free, that the integers m and d should be coprime, or some combination of these.

== Definition ==
More generally, a superelliptic curve is a cyclic branched covering

$$C \to \mathbb{P}^1$$

of the projective line of degree $m \geq 2$ coprime to the characteristic of the field of definition. The degree $m$ of the covering map is also referred to as the degree of the curve. By cyclic covering we mean that the Galois group of the covering (i.e., the corresponding function field extension) is cyclic.

The fundamental theorem of Kummer theory implies that a superelliptic curve of degree $m$ defined over a field $k$ has an affine model given by an equation

$$y^m = f(x)$$

for some polynomial $f \in k[x]$ of degree $m$ with each root having order $< m$, provided that $C$ has a point defined over $k$, that is, if the set $C(k)$ of $k$-rational points of $C$ is not empty. For example, this is always the case when $k$ is algebraically closed. In particular, function field extension $k(C)/k(x)$ is a Kummer extension.

== Ramification ==
Let $C: y^m = f(x)$ be a superelliptic curve defined over an algebraically closed field $k$, and $B' \subset k$ denote the set of roots of $f$ in $k$. Define set
$$B = \begin{cases}
B' &\text{ if }m\text{ divides }\deg(f), \\
B'\cup\{\infty\} &\text{ otherwise.}
\end{cases}$$
Then $B \subset \mathbb{P}^1(k)$ is the set of branch points of the covering map $C \to \mathbb{P}^1$ given by $x$.

For an affine branch point $\alpha \in B$, let $r_\alpha$ denote the order of $\alpha$ as a root of $f$. As before, we assume that $1 \leq r_\alpha < m$. Then
$$e_\alpha = \frac{m}{(m, r_\alpha)}$$
is the ramification index $e(P_{\alpha, i})$ at each of the $(m, r_\alpha)$ ramification points $P_{\alpha, i}$ of the curve lying over $\alpha \in \mathbb{A}^1(k) \subset \mathbb{P}^1(k)$ (that is actually true for any $\alpha \in k$).

For the point at infinity, define integer $0 \leq r_\infty < m$ as follows. If
$$s = \min \{t \in \mathbb{Z} \mid mt \geq \deg(f) \},$$
then $r_\infty = ms - \deg(f)$. Note that $(m, r_\infty) = (m, \deg(f))$. Then analogously to the other ramification points,
$$e_\infty = \frac{m}{(m, r_\infty)}$$
is the ramification index $e(P_{\infty, i})$ at the $(m, r_\infty)$ points $P_{\infty, i}$ that lie over $\infty$. In particular, the curve is unramified over infinity if and only if its degree $m$ divides $\deg(f)$.

Curve $C$ defined as above is connected precisely when $m$ and $r_\alpha$ are relatively prime (not necessarily pairwise), which is assumed to be the case.

== Genus ==
By the Riemann-Hurwitz formula, the genus of a superelliptic curve is given by

$$g = \frac12 \left( m (|B| - 2) - \sum_{\alpha \in B} (m, r_\alpha)\right) + 1.$$

== Diophantine Problem ==
The Diophantine problem of finding integer points on a superelliptic curve can be solved by a method similar to one used for the resolution of hyperelliptic equations: a Siegel identity is used to reduce to a Thue equation.

Stronger results are known. For a given polynomial f with rational coefficients and at least two distinct roots, the above equation has only finitely many integer solutions m, x, y with $m\geq 3, \vert y\vert\geq 2$ and m, x, y are bounded by an effectively computable constant depending only on f. Furthermore, the condition $m\geq 3$ can be replaced by $m\geq 2$ in the case f has at least three distinct roots.

More generally, let $F(X, Y)$ be a binary form such that $F(X, 1)$ has at least two distinct roots and all of them belongs to a finite extension $k$ of $\mathbb{Q}$, O be the ring of integers of $k$, S be the set of integers which are composed only of non-unit elements from a fixed set in O. Moreover, take an ideal I from $k$. Then then equation

$$wz^m=F(x, y)$$

with $w, y\in S, x, z\in O, m\geq 3$, and $(x, y)=I$ implies that heights of w, x, y, z, and m are bounded by an effectively computable constant depending only on f, $k$, and I. Furthermore, the condition $m\geq 3$ can be replaced by $m\geq 2$ in the case $F(X, 1)$ has at least three distinct roots.

== See also ==
- Hyperelliptic curve
- Branched covering
- Artin-Schreier curve
- Kummer theory
- Superellipse
