= Real hyperelliptic curve =

In mathematics, there are two types of hyperelliptic curves, a class of algebraic curves: real hyperelliptic curves and imaginary hyperelliptic curves which differ by the number of points at infinity. Hyperelliptic curves exist for every genus $g \geq 1$. The general formula of hyperelliptic curve over a finite field $K$ is given by
$$C : y^2 + h(x) y = f(x) \in K[x,y]$$
where $h(x), f(x) \in K$ satisfy certain conditions. In this page, we describe more about real hyperelliptic curves, these are curves having two points at infinity while imaginary hyperelliptic curves have one point at infinity.

== Definition ==
A real hyperelliptic curve of genus g over K is defined by an equation of the form $C:y^2+h(x)y = f(x)$ where $h(x) \in K$ has degree not larger than g+1 while $f(x) \in K$ must have degree 2g+1 or 2g+2. This curve is a non singular curve where no point $(x,y)$ in the algebraic closure of $K$ satisfies the curve equation $y^2+h(x)y=f(x)$ and both partial derivative equations: $2y+h(x)=0$ and $h'(x)y=f'(x)$. The set of (finite) $K$–rational points on C is given by
$$C(K) = \left\{ (a,b) \in K^2 \mid b^2 + h(a) b = f(a) \right\} \cup S$$
where $S$ is the set of points at infinity. For real hyperelliptic curves, there are two points at infinity, $\infty_1$ and $\infty_2$. For any point $P(a,b)\in C(K)$, the opposite point of $P$ is given by $\overline{P} = (a, -b - h)$; it is the other point with x-coordinate a that also lies on the curve.

== Example ==
Let $C: y^2=f(x)$ where
$$f(x) = x^6 +3x^5 - 5x^4 - 15x^3 + 4x^2 + 12x = x(x-1)(x-2)(x+1)(x+2)(x+3)$$
over $R$. Since $\deg f(x) = 2g+2$ and $f(x)$ has degree 6, thus $C$ is a curve of genus g = 2.

The homogeneous version of the curve equation is given by
$$Y^2 Z^4 = X^6 + 3 X^5 Z - 5 X^4 Z^2 - 15 X^3 Z^3 + 4X^2 Z^4 + 12X Z^5.$$
It has a single point at infinity given by (0:1:0) but this point is singular. The blowup of $C$ has 2 different points at infinity, which we denote $\infty_1$ and $\infty_2$. Hence this curve is an example of a real hyperelliptic curve.

In general, every curve given by an equation where f has even degree has two points at infinity and is a real hyperelliptic curve while those where f has odd degree have only a single point in the blowup over (0:1:0) and are thus imaginary hyperelliptic curves. In both cases this assumes that the affine part of the curve is non-singular (see the conditions on the derivatives above)

== Arithmetic in a real hyperelliptic curve ==
In real hyperelliptic curve, addition is no longer defined on points as in elliptic curves but on divisors and the Jacobian. Let $C$ be a hyperelliptic curve of genus g over a finite field K. A divisor $D$ on $C$ is a formal finite sum of points $P$ on $C$. We write
$$D = \sum_{P \in C}{n_P P}$$
where $n_P \in\Z$ and $n_p=0$ for almost all $P$.

The degree of $D= \sum_{P \in C}{n_P P}$ is defined by
$$\deg(D) = \sum_{P \in C}{n_P}.$$
$D$ is said to be defined over $K$ if $D^\sigma = \sum_{P \in C}n_P P^\sigma = D$ for all automorphisms σ of $\overline{K}$ over $K$. The set $Div(K)$ of divisors of $C$ defined over $K$ forms an additive abelian group under the addition rule
$$\sum a_P P + \sum b_P P = \sum {(a_P + b_P) P}.$$

The set $Div^0 (K)$ of all degree zero divisors of $C$ defined over $K$ is a subgroup of $Div(K)$.

We take an example:

Let $D_1 = 6 P_1 + 4 P_2$ and $D_2 = 1 P_1 + 5 P_2$. If we add them then $D_1 + D_2 = 7 P_1 + 9 P_2$. The degree of $D_1$ is $\deg(D_1) = 6+4 = 10$ and the degree of $D_2$ is $\deg(D_2) = 1+5 = 6$. Then, $\deg(D_1 + D_2) = \deg(D_1) + \deg(D_2) = 16.$

For polynomials $G\in K[C]$, the divisor of $G$ is defined by
$$\mathrm{div}(G)=\sum_{P\in C} {\mathrm{ord}}_P(G)P.$$
If the function $G$ has a pole at a point $P$ then $-{\mathrm{ord}}_P (G)$ is the order of vanishing of $G$ at $P$. Assume $G, H$ are polynomials in $K[C]$; the divisor of the rational function $F=G/H$ is called a principal divisor and is defined by $\mathrm{div}(F) = \mathrm{div}(G) - \mathrm{div}(H)$. We denote the group of principal divisors by $P(K)$, i.e., $P(K) = \{\mathrm{div}(F) \mid F \in K(C)\}$. The Jacobian of $C$ over $K$ is defined by $J = Div^0/P$. The factor group $J$ is also called the divisor class group of $C$. The elements which are defined over $K$ form the group $J(K)$. We denote by $\overline{D}\in J(K)$ the class of $D$ in $Div^0 (K)/P(K)$.

There are two canonical ways of representing divisor classes for real hyperelliptic curves $C$ which have two points infinity $S=\{\infty_1,\infty_2 \}$. The first one is to represent a degree zero divisor by $\bar{D}$ such that $D=\sum_{i=1}^r P_i-r\infty_2$, where $P_i \in C(\bar{\mathbb{F}}_q)$,$P_i\not= \infty_2$, and $P_i\not=\bar{P_j}$ if $i \neq j$ The representative $D$ of $\bar{D}$ is then called semi reduced. If $D$ satisfies the additional condition $r \leq g$ then the representative $D$ is called reduced. Notice that $P_i=\infty_1$ is allowed for some i. It follows that every degree 0 divisor class contain a unique representative $\bar{D}$ with
$$D= D_x-\deg(D_x ) \infty_2+v_1 (D)(\infty_1-\infty_2),$$
where $D_x$ is divisor that is coprime with both $\infty_1$ and $\infty_2$, and $0\leq \deg(D_x )+v_1(D)\leq g$.

The other representation is balanced at infinity. Let $D_\infty=\infty_1+\infty_2$, note that this divisor is $K$-rational even if the points $\infty_1$ and $\infty_2$ are not independently so. Write the representative of the class $\bar{D}$ as $D=D_1+D_\infty$, where $D_1$ is called the affine part and does not contain $\infty_1$ and $\infty_2$, and let $d=\deg(D_1)$. If $d$ is even then
$$D_\infty= \frac{d}{2}(\infty_1+\infty_2).$$

If $d$ is odd then
$$D_\infty= \frac{d+1}{2} \infty_1+\frac{d-1}{2} \infty_2.$$
For example, let the affine parts of two divisors be given by

$D_1=6P_1+ 4P_2$ and $D_2 = 1P_1+ 5P_2$

then the balanced divisors are

$D_1=6P_1+ 4P_2- 5D_{\infty_1} -5D_{\infty_2}$ and $D_2=1P_1+ 5P_2- 3D_{\infty_1} -3D_{\infty_2}$

== Transformation from real hyperelliptic curve to imaginary hyperelliptic curve ==
Let $C$ be a real quadratic curve over a field $K$. If there exists a ramified prime divisor of degree 1 in $K$ then we are able to perform a birational transformation to an imaginary quadratic curve. A (finite or infinite) point is said to be ramified if it is equal to its own opposite. It means that $P =(a,b) = \overline{P} = (a, -b-h(a))$, i.e. that $h(a)+ 2b=0$. If $P$ is ramified then $D = P - \infty_1$ is a ramified prime divisor.

The real hyperelliptic curve $C:y^2+h(x)y=f(x)$ of genus $g$ with a ramified $K$-rational finite point $P=(a,b)$ is birationally equivalent to an imaginary model $C':y'^2+\bar{h}(x')y'=\bar{f}(x')$ of genus $g$, i.e. $\deg(\bar{f})=2g+1$ and the function fields are equal $K(C)=K(C')$. Here:

$x'= \frac{1}{x-a}$ and $y'= \frac{y+b}{(x-a)^{g+1}}$	i

In our example $C: y^2=f(x)$ where $f(x)=x^6 + 3x^5 - 5x^4 - 15x^3 + 4x^2 + 12x$, h(x) is equal to 0. For any point $P=(a,b)$, $h(a)$ is equal to 0 and so the requirement for P to be ramified becomes $b=0$. Substituting $h(a)$ and $b$, we obtain $f(a)=0$, where $f(a) = a (a-1) (a-2) (a+1) (a+2) (a+3)$, i.e., $a \in \{0,1,2,-1,-2,-3\}$.

From (i), we obtain $x= \frac {ax'+1}{x'}$ and $y= \frac{y'}{x'^{g+1}}$. For g = 2, we have $y = \frac{y'}{x'^3}$.

For example, let $a=1$ then $x= \frac{x'+1}{x'}$ and $y= \frac{y'}{x'^3}$, we obtain
$$\left(\frac{y'}{x'^3 }\right)^2=\frac {x'+1}{x'} \left(\frac {x'+1}{x'}+1\right)\left(\frac {x'+1}{x'}+2\right)\left(\frac {x'+1}{x'}+3\right)\left(\frac {x'+1}{x'}-1\right)\left(\frac {x'+1}{x'}-2\right).$$

To remove the denominators this expression is multiplied by $x^6$, then:
$$y'^2=(x'+1)(2x'+1)(3x'+1)(4x'+1)(1)(1-x')$$
giving the curve
$$C' : y'^2 = \bar{f}(x')$$
where
$$\bar{f}(x') = (x'+1) (2x'+1) (3x'+1) (4x'+1) (1) (1-x') = -24x'^5-26x'^4 + 15x'^3 + 25x'^2 + 9x'+1 .$$

$C'$ is an imaginary quadratic curve since $\bar{f}(x')$ has degree $2g + 1$.
