= Ann Hibner Koblitz =

American historian (born 1952)

- Born: 1952 (age 73–74); Jersey City, New Jersey, U.S.
- Occupation: Historian
- Known for: Cross-cultural perspectives on women in science; Director of the Kovalevskaia Fund
- Spouse: Neal Koblitz
- Awards: Margaret W. Rossiter History of Women in Science Prize; Honorary Doctorate from Saint Mary-of-the-Woods College; President's Friendship Medal (Vietnam)

Academic background
- Education: Princeton University (BA); Boston University (PhD)

Ann Hibner Koblitz (born 1952) is an American historian best known for her studies of the history of women in science. She is Professor Emerita of Women and Gender Studies at Arizona State University and is the Director of the Kovalevskaia Fund, which supports women in science in developing countries.

== Education and career ==
She received her BA in history of science from Princeton University, where she was in the first class of women admitted as undergraduates. She earned her PhD in history from Boston University. She studied and did research in the Soviet Union in 1974–75, 1978, 1981–82, 1985, and 1986. In 1984–85, she was a member of the Institute for Advanced Study in Princeton, after which she had temporary teaching positions at Wellesley College, Oregon State University, and the University of Puget Sound. From 1989 to 1998 she taught at Hartwick College in Oneonta, New York. Since 1998, she has been a professor at Arizona State University.

== Controversies ==
In a graduate seminar in 1977, Ann Hibner Koblitz criticized an article by political scientist Samuel P. Huntington for misusing mathematics in an attempt to buttress his arguments. This led her husband, Neal Koblitz, to include her critique in his article "Mathematics as Propaganda". This in turn inspired mathematician Serge Lang to lead a campaign against the election of Huntington to the National Academy of Sciences. The journalist Charlie Sykes, who describes the episode in detail in his book Profscam, writes that

Samuel Huntington's election to the National Academy of Sciences would probably have been little more than a formality if it had not been for a graduate student named Ann Koblitz. The dispute that would shake the social sciences to their quantitative foundations, that was featured on the front page of The New York Times, in articles in The New Republic, Science, and Discover, and that would convulse the normally insouciant National Academy of Sciences, can be traced back to a single assignment in a graduate seminar on historical methodology at Boston University in 1977.

Despite the vigorous defense of Huntington by Nobel Prize winning economist Herbert Simon, Lang's campaign was successful, and Huntington was twice voted down by the Academy's members.

In the 1980s and 1990s Koblitz was a critic of the gender essentialism of Evelyn Fox Keller, who maintained that modern science is inherently patriarchal and ill-suited for women. Koblitz argued that Keller failed to appreciate the multi-faceted nature of scientific research and the great diversity of experiences of women across cultures and time periods. For example, in the 19th century the first women to earn advanced university degrees in Europe in any field were almost all in the natural sciences and medicine. In an article about the first 20 years of the Association for Women in Mathematics (AWM), the mathematician and former AWM president Lenore Blum wrote

In the mid-1980s, there was a flurry of work by a group of feminist theorists on gender and science. In commentary fairly critical of this work, Ann Hibner Koblitz succinctly summarized the main ideas behind the theory: "Put in its most general guise, the new 'gender theory' says that centuries of male domination of science have affected its content – what questions are asked and what answers are found – and that 'science' and 'objectivity' have become inextricably linked to concepts and ideologies of masculinity." She lists eight criticisms of which I will mention only two, namely, that gender theorists "seem unaware of the increasing numbers of women who have had satisfying lives as scientists" and "employ cartoon-character stereotypes of science, scientists, men, and women."

In the 1990s and early 2000s a group of archaeologists, led by Steven A. LeBlanc of Harvard, popularized the notion that warfare was endemic among all prehistoric peoples. Koblitz analyzed the writings of this group, compared them to other sources, and concluded that the claim of pervasive warfare among the ancient Hohokam people of present-day central Arizona is a modern "masculinist narrative" that has little support in the archaeological record. After speaking at the Old Pueblo Archaeology Center near Tucson, Arizona, Koblitz was asked to write a version of her Men and Masculinities article for the Center's Bulletin. In that article she wrote:

On the basis of scant evidence, they have created a story of prehistoric militarism that harmonizes well with early 21st-century U.S. political culture. Whether this warlike image has much bearing on the actual lives and pursuits of indigenous Southwest populations of the 11th through 15th centuries is, however, open to doubt.

== Philanthropy ==
In 1985 Koblitz and her husband Neal established the Kovalevskaia Fund; it is a nonprofit organization whose purpose is to support and encourage women in developing countries in science, mathematics, engineering, and medicine. It was originally aimed at promoting women in the sciences in Vietnam; it grew out of Ann's work on the history of women and science, her and Neal's experience in the opposition to United States involvement in the Vietnam War, and their efforts to help promote science in Vietnam afterwards. Grants were at first made solely in Vietnam, but were eventually extended to other developing countries.

== Selected works ==
Books

- A Convergence of Lives : Sofia Kovalevskaia – Scientist, Writer, Revolutionary (Second ed.). New Brunswick (New Jersey): Rutgers University Press. 1993. ISBN 9780813519630.
- Science, Women, and Revolution in Russia. Harwood Academic. 2000. ISBN 978-9057026201.
- Sex and Herbs and Birth Control : Women and Fertility Regulation Through the Ages. Kovalevskaia Fund. 2014. ISBN 978-0989665506.

Selected journal publications

- Koblitz, Ann Hibner (1987). "A historian looks at gender and science". International Journal of Science Education. 9 (3): 399–407. Bibcode:1987IJSEd...9..399K. doi:10.1080/0950069870090318.
- Koblitz, Ann Hibner (1988). "Science, women, and the Russian intelligentsia: The generation of the 1860s". Isis. 79 (2): 208–226. doi:10.1086/354696. S2CID 143909227.
- Koblitz, Ann Hibner (2005). "Gender and science where science is on the margins". Bulletin of Science, Technology & Society. 25 (2): 107–114. doi:10.1177/0270467604272640. S2CID 144417539.
- Koblitz, Ann Hibner (2006). "Male bonding around the campfire: Constructing myths of Hohokam militarism". Men and Masculinities. 9 (1): 95–107. doi:10.1177/1097184X05277697. S2CID 140790437.
- Koblitz, Ann Hibner (2016). "Life in the fast lane: Arab women in science and technology". Bulletin of Science, Technology & Society. 36 (2): 107–117. doi:10.1177/0270467616658745. S2CID 147837196.

== Awards and honors ==
- In 1985, Koblitz was invited to give the Kenneth O. May Lecture on the History of Mathematics at the University of Toronto.
- In 1990, Koblitz won the History of Science Society's Margaret W. Rossiter History of Women in Science Prize for her article "Science, Women, and the Russian Intelligentsia: The Generation of the 1860s" that appeared in the Society's journal Isis in 1988.
- In 1995, Koblitz received an honorary doctorate from Saint Mary-of-the-Woods College in Indiana.
- In 2010, the Government of Vietnam conferred a President's Friendship Medal on her.
- In 2015, Koblitz won the "Transdisciplinary Book Award" of the Arizona State University Institute for Humanities Research for her book Sex and Herbs and Birth Control: Women and Fertility Regulation Through the Ages.
