= Weierstrass point =

Point on a nonsingular algebraic curve

In mathematics, a Weierstrass point $P$ on a nonsingular algebraic curve $C$ defined over the complex numbers is a point such that there are more functions on $C$, with their poles restricted to $P$ only, than would be predicted by the Riemann–Roch theorem.

The concept is named after Karl Weierstrass.

Consider the vector spaces

$$L(0), L(P), L(2P), L(3P), \dots$$

where $L(kP)$ is the space of meromorphic functions on $C$ whose order at $P$ is at least $-k$ and with no other poles. We know three things: the dimension is at least 1, because of the constant functions on $C$; it is non-decreasing; and from the Riemann–Roch theorem the dimension eventually increments by exactly 1 as we move to the right. In fact if $g$ is the genus of $C$, the dimension from the $k$-th term is known to be

$l(kP) = k - g + 1,$ for $k \geq 2g - 1.$

Our knowledge of the sequence is therefore

$$1, ?, ?, \dots, ?, g, g + 1, g + 2, \dots.$$

What we know about the ? entries is that they can increment by at most 1 each time (this is a simple argument: $L(nP)/L((n-1)P)$ has dimension as most 1 because if $f$ and $g$ have the same order of pole at $P$, then $f+cg$ will have a pole of lower order if the constant $c$ is chosen to cancel the leading term). There are $2g - 2$ question marks here, so the cases $g = 0$ or $1$ need no further discussion and do not give rise to Weierstrass points.

Assume therefore $g \geq 2$. There will be $g - 1$ steps up, and $g$ steps where there is no increment. A non-Weierstrass point of $C$ occurs whenever the increments are all as far to the right as possible: i.e. the sequence looks like

$$1, 1, \dots, 1, 2, 3, 4, \dots, g - 1, g, g + 1, \dots.$$

Any other case is a Weierstrass point. A Weierstrass gap for $P$ is a value of $k$ such that no function on $C$ has exactly a $k$-fold pole at $P$ only. The gap sequence is

$$1, 2, \dots, g$$

for a non-Weierstrass point. For a Weierstrass point it contains at least one higher number. (The Weierstrass gap theorem or Lückensatz is the statement that there must be $g$ gaps.)

For hyperelliptic curves, for example, we may have a function $F$ with a double pole at $P$ only. Its powers have poles of order $4, 6$ and so on. Therefore, such a $P$ has the gap sequence

$$1, 3, 5, \dots, 2g - 1.$$

In general if the gap sequence is

$$a, b, c, \dots$$

the weight of the Weierstrass point is

$$(a - 1) + (b - 2) + (c - 3) + \dots.$$

This is introduced because of a counting theorem: on a Riemann surface the sum of the weights of the Weierstrass points is $g(g^2 - 1).$

For example, a hyperelliptic Weierstrass point, as above, has weight $g(g - 1)/2.$ Therefore, there are (at most) $2(g + 1)$ of them. The $2g+2$ ramification points of the ramified covering of degree two from a hyperelliptic curve to the projective line are all hyperelliptic Weierstrass points and these exhausts all the Weierstrass points on a hyperelliptic curve of genus $g$.

Further information on the gaps comes from applying Clifford's theorem. Multiplication of functions gives the non-gaps a numerical semigroup structure, and an old question of Adolf Hurwitz asked for a characterization of the semigroups occurring. A new necessary condition was found by R.-O. Buchweitz in 1980 and he gave an example of a subsemigroup of the nonnegative integers with 16 gaps that does not occur as the semigroup of non-gaps at a point on a curve of genus 16 (see). A definition of Weierstrass point for a nonsingular curve over a field of positive characteristic was given by F. K. Schmidt in 1939.

== Positive characteristic ==
More generally, for a nonsingular algebraic curve $C$ defined over an algebraically closed field $k$ of characteristic $p \geq 0$, the gap numbers for all but finitely many points is a fixed sequence $\epsilon_1, ..., \epsilon_g.$ These points are called non-Weierstrass points. All points of $C$ whose gap sequence is different are called Weierstrass points.

If $\epsilon_1, ..., \epsilon_g = 1, ..., g$ then the curve is called a classical curve. Otherwise, it is called non-classical. In characteristic zero, all curves are classical.

Hermitian curves are an example of non-classical curves. These are projective curves defined over finite field $GF(q^2)$ by equation $y^q + y = x^{q+1}$, where $q$ is a prime power.
