= Branched covering =

Generalization of covers

In mathematics, a branched covering is a map that is almost a covering map, except on a small set.

== In topology ==
In topology, a map is a branched covering if it is a covering map everywhere except for a nowhere dense set known as the branch set. Examples include the map from a wedge of circles to a single circle, where the map is a homeomorphism on each circle.

== In algebraic geometry ==
In algebraic geometry, the term branched covering is used to describe morphisms $f$ from an algebraic variety $V$ to another one $W$, the two dimensions being the same, and the typical fibre of $f$ being of dimension 0.

In that case, there will be an open set $W'$ of $W$ (for the Zariski topology) that is dense in $W$, such that the restriction of $f$ to $W'$ (from $V' = f^{-1}(W')$ to $W'$, that is) is unramified. Depending on the context, we can take this as local homeomorphism for the strong topology, over the complex numbers, or as an étale morphism in general (under some slightly stronger hypotheses, on flatness and separability). Generically, then, such a morphism resembles a covering space in the topological sense. For example, if $V$ and $W$ are both compact Riemann surfaces, we require only that $f$ is holomorphic and not constant, and then there is a finite set of points $P$ of $W$, outside of which we do find an honest covering

$$V' \to W'$$.

=== Ramification locus ===
The set of exceptional points on $W$ is called the ramification locus (i.e. this is the complement of the largest possible open set $W'$). In general monodromy occurs according to the fundamental group of $W'$ acting on the sheets of the covering (this topological picture can be made precise also in the case of a general base field).

An unramified covering then is the occurrence of an empty ramification locus.

=== Kummer extensions ===
Branched coverings are easily constructed as Kummer extensions, i.e. as algebraic extension of the function field. The hyperelliptic curves are prototypic examples.

== Examples ==
=== Elliptic curve ===
Morphisms of curves provide many examples of ramified coverings. For example, let C be the elliptic curve of equation

$$y^2 - x(x-1)(x-2)=0.$$

The projection of C onto the x-axis is a ramified cover with ramification locus given by

$$x(x-1)(x-2)=0.$$

This is because for these three values of x the fiber is the double point $y^2=0,$ while for any other value of x, the fiber consists of two distinct points (over an algebraically closed field).

This projection induces an algebraic extension of degree two of the function fields: Also, if we take the fraction fields of the underlying commutative rings, we get the morphism

$$\mathbb{C}(x) \to \mathbb{C}(x)[y]/(y^2 - x(x-1)(x-2))$$

Hence this projection is a degree 2 branched covering. This can be homogenized to construct a degree 2 branched covering of the corresponding projective elliptic curve to the projective line.

=== Plane algebraic curve ===
The previous example may be generalized to any algebraic plane curve in the following way. Let C be a plane curve defined by the equation f(x,y) = 0, where f is a separable and irreducible polynomial in two indeterminates. If n is the degree of f in y, then the fiber consists of n distinct points, except for a finite number of values of x. Thus, this projection is a branched covering of degree n.

The exceptional values of x are the roots of the coefficient of $y^n$ in f, and the roots of the discriminant of f with respect to y.

Over a root r of the discriminant, there is at least a ramified point, which is either a critical point or a singular point. If r is also a root of the coefficient of $y^n$ in f, then this ramified point is "at infinity".

Over a root s of the coefficient of $y^n$ in f, the curve C has an infinite branch, and the fiber at s has less than n points. However, if one extends the projection to the projective completions of C and the x-axis, and if s is not a root of the discriminant, the projection becomes a covering over a neighbourhood of s.

The fact that this projection is a branched covering of degree n may also be seen by considering the function fields. In fact, this projection corresponds to the field extension of degree n

$$\mathbb C(x) \to \mathbb C(x)[y]/f(x,y).$$

=== Varying Ramifications ===
We can also generalize branched coverings of the line with varying ramification degrees. Consider a polynomial of the form

$$f(x,y) = g(x)$$

as we choose different points $x=\alpha$, the fibers given by the vanishing locus of $f(\alpha,y) - g(\alpha)$ vary. At any point where the multiplicity of one of the linear terms in the factorization of $f(\alpha,y) - g(\alpha)$ increases by one, there is a ramification.

== Scheme Theoretic Examples ==
=== Elliptic Curves ===
Morphisms of curves provide many examples of ramified coverings of schemes. For example, the morphism from an affine elliptic curve to a line

$$\text{Spec}\left( {\mathbb{C}[x,y]}/{(y^2 - x(x-1)(x-2)} \right) \to \text{Spec}(\mathbb{C}[x])$$

is a ramified cover with ramification locus given by

$$X = \text{Spec}\left({\mathbb{C}[x]}/{(x(x-1)(x-2))} \right)$$

This is because at any point of $X$ in $\mathbb{A}^1$ the fiber is the scheme

$$\text{Spec}\left({\mathbb{C}[y]}/{(y^2)} \right)$$

Also, if we take the fraction fields of the underlying commutative rings, we get the field homomorphism

$$\mathbb{C}(x) \to {\mathbb{C}(x)[y]}/{(y^2 - x(x-1)(x-2))},$$

which is an algebraic extension of degree two; hence we got a degree 2 branched covering of an elliptic curve to the affine line. This can be homogenized to construct a morphism of a projective elliptic curve to $\mathbb{P}^1$.

=== Hyperelliptic curve ===
A hyperelliptic curve provides a generalization of the above degree $2$ cover of the affine line, by considering the affine scheme defined over $\mathbb C$ by a polynomial of the form

$y^2 - \prod(x-a_i)$ where $a_i \neq a_j$ for $i\neq j$

=== Higher Degree Coverings of the Affine Line ===
We can generalize the previous example by taking the morphism

$$\text{Spec}\left( \frac{\mathbb{C}[x,y]}{(f(y) - g(x))} \right) \to \text{Spec}(\mathbb{C}[x])$$

where $g(x)$ has no repeated roots. Then the ramification locus is given by

$$X = \text{Spec}\left( \frac{\mathbb{C}[x]}{(f(x))} \right)$$

where the fibers are given by

$$\text{Spec}\left( \frac{\mathbb{C}[y]}{(f(y))} \right)$$

Then, we get an induced morphism of fraction fields

$$\mathbb{C}(x) \to \frac{\mathbb{C}(x)[y]}{(f(y) - g(x))}$$

There is an $\mathbb{C}(x)$-module isomorphism of the target with

$$\mathbb{C}(x)\oplus\mathbb{C}(x)\cdot y \oplus \cdots \oplus \mathbb{C}(x)\cdot y^{\text{deg}(f(y))}$$

Hence the cover is of degree $\text{deg}(f)$.

=== Superelliptic Curves ===
Superelliptic curves are a generalization of hyperelliptic curves and a specialization of the previous family of examples since they are given by affine schemes $X/\mathbb{C}$ from polynomials of the form

$y^k - f(x)$ where $k>2$ and $f(x)$ has no repeated roots.

=== Ramified Coverings of Projective Space ===
Another useful class of examples come from ramified coverings of projective space. Given a homogeneous polynomial $f \in \mathbb{C}[x_0,\ldots,x_n]$ we can construct a ramified covering of $\mathbb{P}^n$ with ramification locus

$$\text{Proj}\left( \frac{\mathbb{C}[x_0,\ldots,x_n]}{f(x)} \right)$$

by considering the morphism of projective schemes

$$\text{Proj}\left( \frac{\mathbb{C}[x_0,\ldots,x_n][y]}{y^{\text{deg}(f)} - f(x)} \right) \to \mathbb{P}^n$$

Again, this will be a covering of degree $\text{deg}(f)$.

== Applications ==
Branched coverings $C \to X$ come with a symmetry group of transformations $G$. Since the symmetry group has stabilizers at the points of the ramification locus, branched coverings can be used to construct examples of orbifolds, or Deligne–Mumford stacks.

== See also ==
- Étale morphism
- Orbifold
- Stack (mathematics)
