= Steven A. LeBlanc =

American archaeologist (born 1943)

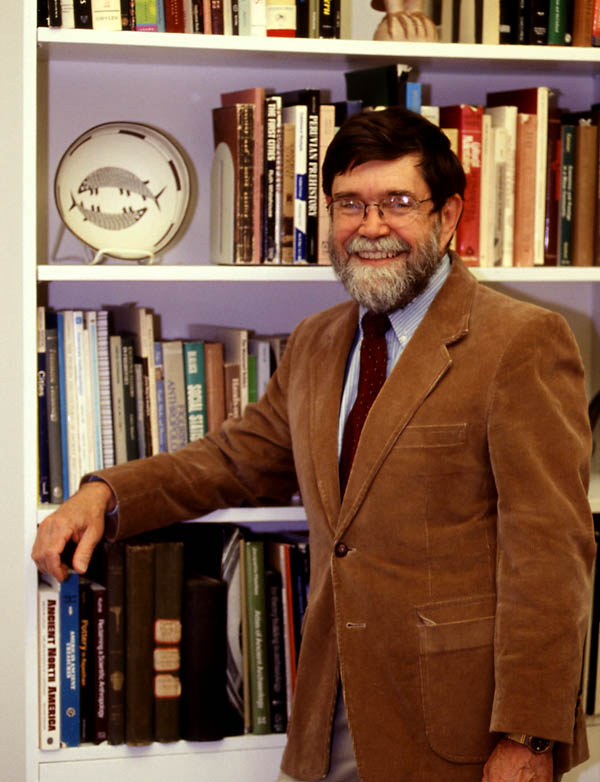
- Steven A. LeBlanc in his office
- Born: 1943 (age 82–83)
- Occupation: Archaeologist

Steven A. LeBlanc (born 1943) is an American archaeologist and former director of collections at the Peabody Museum of Archaeology and Ethnology at Harvard University's Peabody Museum.

He is the author of a number of books about Southwest archeology and prehistoric warfare.

== Research ==
The primary cause of war, as LeBlanc sees it, is ecological imbalance; humans compete for finite amounts of food when population outstrips supply or when the land becomes overgrazed and deforested. Conflict flash points-the Middle East and the Balkans, for instance-have a "long history of ecological stress and degradation."

LeBlanc argues that ecological balance was rarely the norm, even in pockets of paradise. One might expect, for example, that the inhabitants of Tikopia, a remote island in the South Pacific, would make fine stewards of their natural environs. But even they repeated the historical theme: "A few people occupy the...land, they exterminate many species, they heavily modify the landscape, and their numbers grow. They never remain in anything approaching ecological balance."

And the impulse to conduct warfare goes all the way back to our primate precursors. "Our closest ape relatives," he says, have always engaged in ferocious acts of warfare, chillingly reminiscent of human conflict (as Jane Goodall observed among chimpanzees in the jungles of Tanzania in the 1960s).

=== Myth of the "Noble savage" ===
As humans evolved, violence was the norm; the myth of the "noble savage", is a distinctly modern invention (first advanced by Jean-Jacques Rousseau and his followers in the 18th century). Skeletal remains of humans from sites all over the world reflect horrific violence. At burial locations of the ancient Aborigines of Australia-hunter-gatherers with no permanent settlements-we find "evidence of violent deaths and even massacres, and specialized weapons useful only for warfare."

The replacement of foraging by farming, a development that occurred sometime around 10,000 B.C. in what is now, ironically enough, Iraq, placed a great many stresses on the environment. As populations began to rise, natural resources were increasingly exploited. Thus warfare, in the age of emergent agriculture, "became more common and deadly than forager warfare."

LeBlanc does not believe that humans are genetically precluded from peaceful coexistence. "As long as resource scarcities continue in many parts of the world," he writes, "I expect conflict based on competition over resources to continue, even if it is sometimes disguised as ideological. This does not doom us to a future of war any more than our past dooms us to a future of heart attacks." But "if we do not strive to understand what we have done in the past and why," he says, "it will only make it harder to get it right in the future."

Azar Gat expresses similar arguments in the first chapters of War in Human Civilization (Oxford UP, 2006).

== Publications ==
- Explanation in Archeology, with Patty Jo Watson and Charles L. Redman. Columbia University Press. 1971. Translated into Spanish as En Metodo cientifico en arqueologia 1974. Alianza Universidad Press, Madrid.
- An Archeological Synthesis of South Central and Southwestern New Mexico, with Michael E. Whalen and contributions by R. Anyon, P.A. Gilman, P.E. Minnis, D. Rugge and M. Nelson. Office of Contract Archaeology. University of New Mexico, Albuquerque. 1979
- Vandalism of Cultural Resources: The Growing Threat to Our Nation's Heritage, with Dee F. Green (eds.) Cultural Resource Report No. 28, U.S.F.S. Southwestern Region, Albuquerque. 1979
- The Mimbres People: Ancient Painters of the American Southwest. Thames and Hudson. London, New York. 1983
- Mimbres Pottery: Ancient Art of the American Southwest, with J.J. Brody and Catherine J. Scott. Hudson Hills Press, New York. 1983
- The Galaz Ruin: A prehistoric Mimbres village in Southwestern New Mexico, with Roger Anyon. Contributions by Paul Minnis, James Lancaster and Margaret C. Nelson. University of New Mexico Press, Albuquerque. 1984
- Archeological Explanation, with Patty Jo Watson and Charles Redman. Columbia University Press, New York. 1984
- Short-Term Sedentism in the American Southwest: The Mimbres Valley Salado, with Ben A. Nelson. Contributions by James W. Lancaster, Paul E. Minnis, and Margaret C. Nelson. The University of New Mexico Press, Albuquerque. 1986
- Girikihaciyan: A Halaf site in Southeastern Turkey, with Patty J. Watson. Institute of Archaeology, University of California, Los Angeles. 1990
- Prehistoric Warfare in the American Southwest. University of Utah Press. Salt Lake City. 1999
- "Early Pithouse Villages of the Mimbres Valley and Beyond: The McAnally and Thompson Sites in their Cultural and Ecological Contexts, with Michael W. Diehl", Papers of the Peabody Museum of Archaeology and Ethnology. Vol. 83. Harvard University. 2001
- Deadly Landscapes: Case Studies in Prehistoric Southwestern Warfare. editor with Glen Rice. University of Utah Press. 2001
- Constant Battles: The Myth of the Peaceful, Noble Savage with Katherine E. Register. St. Martin’s Press. New York. 2003. Translated into Estonian as: Lakkamatud taplused: Müüt Rahumeelsest ja õilsast metslasest. Olion: Tallinn 2004.
- Painted by a Distant Hand: Mimbres Pottery from the American Southwest, Peabody Museum Collection Series, Peabody Museum of Archaeology and Ethnology, Harvard University. 2004
- Symbols in Clay: Seeking Artists’ Identities in Hopi Yellow Ware Bowls with Lucia Henderson", Papers of the Peabody Museum of Archaeology and Ethnology, Vol. 84. Harvard University. 2009
