= Neal Koblitz =

American mathematician and cryptographer (born 1948)

- Born: Neal I. Koblitz; December 24, 1948 (age 77)
- Education: Harvard University (BA); Princeton University (PhD)
- Known for: Hyperelliptic curve cryptography; Elliptic curve cryptography; Gross–Koblitz formula
- Spouse: Ann Hibner Koblitz
- Awards: Levchin Prize (2021)
- Scientific career
- Fields: Mathematics; cryptography
- Workplaces: University of Washington; University of Waterloo
- Thesis: p-adic variation of the zeta-function over families of varieties defined over finite fields (1974)
- Doctoral advisor: Nick Katz
- Doctoral students: Daqing Wan
- Website: www.math.washington.edu/~koblitz/

Neal I. Koblitz (born December 24, 1948) is an American mathematician and cryptographer. He is a professor of mathematics at the University of Washington and an adjunct professor with the Centre for Applied Cryptographic Research at the University of Waterloo. He is the creator of hyperelliptic curve cryptography and the independent co-creator of elliptic curve cryptography.

== Biography ==
Neal I. Koblitz was born on December 24, 1948. He received his BA in mathematics from Harvard University in 1969. While at Harvard, he was a Putnam Fellow in 1968. He received his PhD from Princeton University in 1974 under the direction of Nick Katz. From 1975 to 1979, he was an instructor at Harvard University. In 1979, he began working at the University of Washington.

Koblitz's 1981 article "Mathematics as Propaganda" criticized the misuse of mathematics in the social sciences and helped motivate Serge Lang's successful challenge to the nomination of political scientist Samuel P. Huntington to the National Academy of Sciences. In The Mathematical Intelligencer, Koblitz, Steven Weintraub, and Saunders Mac Lane later criticized the arguments of Herbert A. Simon, who had attempted to defend Huntington's work.

He co-invented elliptic-curve cryptography in 1985 with Victor S. Miller, and for this was awarded the Levchin Prize in 2021.

In 1985, he and his wife, Ann Hibner Koblitz, founded the Kovalevskaia Prize to honor women scientists in developing countries. It was financed from the royalties of Ann Hibner Koblitz's 1983 biography of Sofia Kovalevskaia.

Koblitz's 2007 article "The uneasy relationship between mathematics and cryptography" discusses the increased contact between mathematics and cryptography in the 1990s. He argues that there is an unjustified "aura" placed onto mathematical proofs in cryptographic competitions and received much ire for the view. Koblitz, in co-operation with Alfred Menezes, went on to write a series of Another Look papers that describe errors or weaknesses in existing security proofs, the first being Another look at HMAC (2013). The two now maintain a website dedicated to this type of papers.

In 2011, Koblitz published "Elliptic curve cryptography: The serpentine course of a paradigm shift" with Ann Hibner Koblitz and Alfred Menezes. Using the history of ECC and shifting attitudes in the cryptographic community, the article argues that the field of cryptography is not as scientific and meritocratic as cryptographers want to show to the outside world; the field is controlled by social factors, especially path dependence.

== Selected publications ==
- — (1984) [1977]. p-adic Numbers, p-adic Analysis, and Zeta-Functions. Graduate Texts in Mathematics. Vol. 58 (Second ed.). New York: Springer-Verlag. doi:10.1007/978-1-4612-1112-9. ISBN 978-1-4612-1112-9.
- — (1980). p-adic Analysis: a Short Course on Recent Work. London Mathematical Society Lecture Note Series. Vol. 46. Cambridge: Cambridge University Press. ISBN 9780521280600.
- — (1993) [1984]. Introduction to Elliptic Curves and Modular Forms. Graduate Texts in Mathematics. Vol. 97 (Second ed.). New York: Springer-Verlag. doi:10.1007/978-1-4612-0909-6. ISBN 978-1-4612-0909-6.
- — (1994) [1987]. A Course in Number Theory and Cryptography. Graduate Texts in Mathematics. Vol. 114 (Second ed.). New York: Springer-Verlag. doi:10.1007/978-1-4419-8592-7. ISBN 978-1-4419-8592-7.
- — (1998). Algebraic Aspects of Cryptography. Algorithms and Computation in Mathematics. Vol. 3. New York: Springer-Verlag. doi:10.1007/978-3-662-03642-6. ISBN 978-3-662-03642-6.
- — (2008). Random Curves: Journeys of a Mathematician. Springer-Verlag. doi:10.1007/978-3-540-74078-0. ISBN 978-3540740773.
