= Flat vector bundle =

In mathematics, a vector bundle is said to be flat if it is endowed with a linear connection with vanishing curvature, i.e. a flat connection.

== de Rham cohomology of a flat vector bundle ==
Let $\pi:E \to X$ denote a flat vector bundle, and $\nabla : \Gamma(X, E) \to \Gamma\left(X, \Omega_X^1 \otimes E\right)$ be the covariant derivative associated to the flat connection on E.

Let $\Omega_X^* (E) = \Omega^*_X \otimes E$ denote the vector space (in fact a sheaf of modules over $\mathcal O_X$) of differential forms on X with values in E. The covariant derivative defines a degree-1 endomorphism d, the differential of $\Omega_X^*(E)$, and the flatness condition is equivalent to the property $d^2 = 0$.

In other words, the graded vector space $\Omega_X^* (E)$ is a cochain complex. Its cohomology is called the de Rham cohomology of E, or de Rham cohomology with coefficients twisted by the local coefficient system E.

== Flat trivializations ==
A trivialization of a flat vector bundle is said to be flat if the connection form vanishes in this trivialization. An equivalent definition of a flat bundle is the choice of a trivializing atlas with locally constant transition maps.

== Examples ==
- Trivial line bundles can have several flat bundle structures. An example is the trivial bundle over $\mathbb C\backslash \{0\},$ with the connection forms 0 and $-\frac{1}{2}\frac{dz}{z}$. The parallel vector fields are constant in the first case, and proportional to local determinations of the square root in the second.
- The real canonical line bundle $\Lambda^{\mathrm{top}}M$ of a differential manifold M is a flat line bundle, called the orientation bundle. Its sections are volume forms.
- A Riemannian manifold is flat if and only if its Levi-Civita connection gives its tangent vector bundle a flat structure.

== See also ==
- Vector-valued differential forms
- Local system, the more general notion of a locally constant sheaf.
- Orientation character, a characteristic form related to the orientation line bundle, useful to formulate Twisted Poincaré duality
- Picard group whose connected component, the Jacobian variety, is the moduli space of algebraic flat line bundles.
- Monodromy, or representations of the fundamental group by parallel transport on flat bundles.
- Holonomy, the obstruction to flatness.
