= Sheaf of modules =

Sheaf consisting of modules on a ringed space; generalizing vector bundles

In mathematics, a sheaf of O-modules or simply an O-module over a ringed space (X, O) is a sheaf of abelian groups F such that, for any open subset U of X, F(U) is an O(U)-module and the restriction maps F(U) → F(V) are compatible with the restriction maps O(U) → O(V): the restriction of fs is the restriction of f times the restriction of s for any f in O(U) and s in F(U).

The standard case is when X is a scheme and O its structure sheaf. If O is the constant sheaf $\underline{\mathbf{Z}}$, then a sheaf of O-modules is the same as a sheaf of abelian groups (i.e., an abelian sheaf).

If X is the prime spectrum of a ring R, then any R-module defines an O_{X}-module (called an associated sheaf) in a natural way. Similarly, if R is a graded ring and X is the Proj of R, then any graded module defines an O_{X}-module in a natural way. O-modules arising in such a fashion are examples of quasi-coherent sheaves, and in fact, on affine or projective schemes, all quasi-coherent sheaves are obtained this way.

Sheaves of modules over a ringed space form an abelian category. Moreover, this category has enough injectives, and consequently one can and does define the sheaf cohomology $\operatorname{H}^i(X, -)$ as the i-th right derived functor of the global section functor $\Gamma(X, -)$.

== Examples ==
- Given a ringed space (X, O), if F is an O-submodule of O, then it is called the sheaf of ideals or ideal sheaf of O, since for each open subset U of X, F(U) is an ideal of the ring O(U).
- Let X be a smooth variety of dimension n. Then the tangent sheaf of X is the dual of the cotangent sheaf $\Omega_X$ and the canonical sheaf $\omega_X$ is the n-th exterior power (determinant) of $\Omega_X$.
- A sheaf of algebras is a sheaf of modules that is also a sheaf of rings.

== Operations ==
Let (X, O) be a ringed space. If F and G are O-modules, then their tensor product, denoted by

$F \otimes_O G$ or $F \otimes G$,

is the O-module that is the sheaf associated to the presheaf $U \mapsto F(U) \otimes_{O(U)} G(U).$ (To see that sheafification cannot be avoided, compute the global sections of $O(1) \otimes O(-1) = O$ where O(1) is Serre's twisting sheaf on a projective space.)

Similarly, if F and G are O-modules, then

$$\mathcal{H}om_O(F, G)$$

denotes the O-module that is the sheaf $U \mapsto \operatorname{Hom}_{O|_U}(F|_U, G|_U)$. In particular, the O-module

$$\mathcal{H}om_O(F, O)$$

is called the dual module of F and is denoted by $\check F$. Note: for any O-modules E, F, there is a canonical homomorphism

$$\check{E} \otimes F \to \mathcal{H}om_O(E, F)$$,

which is an isomorphism if E is a locally free sheaf of finite rank. In particular, if L is locally free of rank one (such L is called an invertible sheaf or a line bundle), then this reads:

$$\check{L} \otimes L \simeq O,$$

implying the isomorphism classes of invertible sheaves form a group. This group is called the Picard group of X and is canonically identified with the first cohomology group $\operatorname{H}^1(X, \mathcal{O}^*)$ (by the standard argument with Čech cohomology).

If E is a locally free sheaf of finite rank, then there is an O-linear map $\check{E} \otimes E \simeq \operatorname{End}_O(E) \to O$ given by the pairing; it is called the trace map of E.

For any O-module F, the tensor algebra, exterior algebra and symmetric algebra of F are defined in the same way. For example, the k-th exterior power

$$\bigwedge^k F$$

is the sheaf associated to the presheaf $U \mapsto \bigwedge^k_{O(U)} F(U)$. If F is locally free of rank n, then $\bigwedge^n F$ is called the determinant line bundle (though technically invertible sheaf) of F, denoted by det(F). There is a natural perfect pairing:

$$\bigwedge^r F \otimes \bigwedge^{n-r} F \to \det(F).$$

Let f: (X, O) →(X', O') be a morphism of ringed spaces. If F is an O-module, then the direct image sheaf $f_* F$ is an O'-module through the natural map O' →f_{*}O (such a natural map is part of the data of a morphism of ringed spaces.)

If G is an O'-module, then the module inverse image $f^* G$ of G is the O-module given as the tensor product of modules:

$$f^{-1} G \otimes_{f^{-1} O'} O$$

where $f^{-1} G$ is the inverse image sheaf of G and $f^{-1} O' \to O$ is obtained from $O' \to f_* O$ by adjuction.

There is an adjoint relation between $f_*$ and $f^*$: for any O-module F and O'-module G,

$$\operatorname{Hom}_{O}(f^* G, F) \simeq \operatorname{Hom}_{O'}(G, f_*F)$$

as abelian group. There is also the projection formula: for an O-module F and a locally free O'-module E of finite rank,

$$f_*(F \otimes f^*E) \simeq f_* F \otimes E.$$

== Properties ==
Let (X, O) be a ringed space. An O-module F is said to be generated by global sections if there is a surjection of O-modules:

$$\bigoplus_{i \in I} O \to F \to 0.$$

Explicitly, this means that there are global sections s_{i} of F such that the images of s_{i} in each stalk F_{x} generate F_{x} as O_{x}-module.

An example of such a sheaf is that associated in algebraic geometry to an R-module M, R being any commutative ring, on the spectrum of a ring Spec(R). Another example: according to Cartan's theorem A, any coherent sheaf on a Stein manifold is spanned by global sections. (cf. Serre's theorem A below.) In the theory of schemes, a related notion is ample line bundle. (For example, if L is an ample line bundle, some power of it is generated by global sections.)

An injective O-module is flasque (i.e., all restrictions maps F(U) → F(V) are surjective). Since a flasque sheaf is acyclic in the category of abelian sheaves, this implies that the i-th right derived functor of the global section functor $\Gamma(X, -)$ in the category of O-modules coincides with the usual i-th sheaf cohomology in the category of abelian sheaves.

== Sheaf associated to a module ==
Let $M$ be a module over a ring $A$. Put $X=\operatorname{Spec}(A)$ and write $D(f) = \{ f \ne 0 \} = \operatorname{Spec}(A[f^{-1}])$. For each pair $D(f) \subseteq D(g)$, by the universal property of localization, there is a natural map

$$\rho_{g, f}: M[g^{-1}] \to M[f^{-1}]$$

having the property that $\rho_{g, f} = \rho_{g, h} \circ \rho_{h, f}$. Then

$$D(f) \mapsto M[f^{-1}]$$

is a contravariant functor from the category whose objects are the sets D(f) and morphisms the inclusions of sets to the category of abelian groups. One can show it is in fact a B-sheaf (i.e., it satisfies the gluing axiom) and thus defines the sheaf $\widetilde{M}$ on X called the sheaf associated to M.

The most basic example is the structure sheaf on X; i.e., $\mathcal{O}_X = \widetilde{A}$. Moreover, $\widetilde{M}$ has the structure of $\mathcal{O}_X = \widetilde{A}$-module and thus one gets the exact functor $M \mapsto \widetilde{M}$ from Mod_{A}, the category of modules over A to the category of modules over $\mathcal{O}_X$. It defines an equivalence from Mod_{A} to the category of quasi-coherent sheaves on X, with the inverse $\Gamma(X, -)$, the global section functor. When X is Noetherian, the functor is an equivalence from the category of finitely generated A-modules to the category of coherent sheaves on X.

The construction has the following properties: for any A-modules M, N, and any morphism $\varphi:M\to N$,

- $M[f^{-1}]^{\sim} = \widetilde{M}|_{D(f)}$.
- For any prime ideal p of A, $\widetilde{M}_p \simeq M_p$ as O_{p} = A_{p}-module.
- $(M \otimes_A N)^{\sim} \simeq \widetilde{M} \otimes_{\widetilde{A}} \widetilde{N}$.
- If M is finitely presented, $\operatorname{Hom}_A(M, N)^{\sim} \simeq \mathcal{H}om_{\widetilde{A}}(\widetilde{M}, \widetilde{N})$.
- $\operatorname{Hom}_A(M, N) \simeq \Gamma(X, \mathcal{H}om_{\widetilde{A}}(\widetilde{M}, \widetilde{N}))$, since the equivalence between Mod_{A} and the category of quasi-coherent sheaves on X.
- $(\varinjlim M_i)^{\sim} \simeq \varinjlim \widetilde{M_i}$; in particular, taking a direct sum and ~ commute.
- A sequence of A-modules is exact if and only if the induced sequence by $\sim$ is exact. In particular, $(\ker(\varphi))^{\sim}=\ker(\widetilde{\varphi}), (\operatorname{coker}(\varphi))^{\sim}=\operatorname{coker}(\widetilde{\varphi}), (\operatorname{im}(\varphi))^{\sim}=\operatorname{im}(\widetilde{\varphi})$.

== Sheaf associated to a graded module ==
There is a graded analog of the construction and equivalence in the preceding section. Let R be a graded ring generated by degree-one elements as R_{0}-algebra (R_{0} means the degree-zero piece) and M a graded R-module. Let X be the Proj of R (so X is a projective scheme if R is Noetherian). Then there is an O-module $\widetilde{M}$ such that for any homogeneous element f of positive degree of R, there is a natural isomorphism

$$\widetilde{M}|_{\{f \ne 0\}} \simeq (M[f^{-1}]_0)^{\sim}$$

as sheaves of modules on the affine scheme $\{f \ne 0\} = \operatorname{Spec}(R[f^{-1}]_0)$; in fact, this defines $\widetilde{M}$ by gluing.

Example: Let R(1) be the graded R-module given by R(1)_{n} = R_{n+1}. Then $O(1) = \widetilde{R(1)}$ is called Serre's twisting sheaf, which is the dual of the tautological line bundle if R is finitely generated in degree-one.

If F is an O-module on X, then, writing $F(n) = F \otimes O(n)$, there is a canonical homomorphism:

$$\left(\bigoplus_{n \ge 0} \Gamma(X, F(n))\right)^{\sim} \to F,$$

which is an isomorphism if and only if F is quasi-coherent.

== Computing sheaf cohomology ==
Sheaf cohomology has a reputation for being difficult to calculate. Because of this, the next general fact is fundamental for any practical computation:

Theorem—Let X be a topological space, F an abelian sheaf on it and $\mathfrak{U}$ an open cover of X such that $\operatorname{H}^i(U_{i_0} \cap \cdots \cap U_{i_p}, F) = 0$ for any i, p and $U_{i_j}$'s in $\mathfrak{U}$. Then for any i,

$$\operatorname{H}^i(X, F) = \operatorname{H}^{i}(C^{\bullet}(\mathfrak{U}, F))$$

where the right-hand side is the i-th Čech cohomology.

Serre's vanishing theorem states that if X is a projective variety and F a coherent sheaf on it, then, for sufficiently large n, the Serre twist F(n) is generated by finitely many global sections. Moreover,

1. For each i, H^{i}(X, F) is finitely generated over R_{0}, and
2. There is an integer n_{0}, depending on F, such that
  $$\operatorname{H}^i(X, F(n)) = 0, \, i \ge 1, n \ge n_0.$$

== Sheaf extension ==
Let (X, O) be a ringed space, and let F, H be sheaves of O-modules on X. An extension of H by F is a short exact sequence of O-modules

$$0 \rightarrow F \rightarrow G \rightarrow H \rightarrow 0.$$

As with group extensions, if we fix F and H, then all equivalence classes of extensions of H by F form an abelian group (cf. Baer sum), which is isomorphic to the Ext group $\operatorname{Ext}_O^1(H,F)$, where the identity element in $\operatorname{Ext}_O^1(H,F)$ corresponds to the trivial extension.

In the case where H is O, we have: for any i ≥ 0,

$$\operatorname{H}^i(X, F) = \operatorname{Ext}_O^i(O,F),$$

since both the sides are the right derived functors of the same functor $\Gamma(X, -) = \operatorname{Hom}_O(O, -).$

Note: Some authors, notably Hartshorne, drop the subscript O.

Assume X is a projective scheme over a Noetherian ring. Let F, G be coherent sheaves on X and i an integer. Then there exists n_{0} such that

$$\operatorname{Ext}_O^i(F, G(n)) = \Gamma(X, \mathcal{Ext}_O^i(F, G(n))), \, n \ge n_0$$,

where $\mathcal{Ext}_O$ denotes the derived functors of $\mathcal{Hom}_O$.

=== Locally free resolutions ===
$\mathcal{Ext}(\mathcal{F},\mathcal{G})$ can be readily computed for any coherent sheaf $\mathcal{F}$ using a locally free resolution: given a complex

$$\cdots \to \mathcal{L}_2 \to \mathcal{L}_1 \to \mathcal{L}_0 \to \mathcal{F} \to 0$$

then

$$\mathcal{RHom}(\mathcal{F},\mathcal{G}) = \mathcal{Hom}(\mathcal{L}_\bullet,\mathcal{G})$$

hence

$$\mathcal{Ext}^k(\mathcal{F},\mathcal{G}) = h^k(\mathcal{Hom}(\mathcal{L}_\bullet,\mathcal{G}))$$

=== Examples ===
==== Hypersurface ====
Consider a smooth hypersurface $X$ of degree $d$. Then, we can compute a resolution

$$\mathcal{O}(-d) \to \mathcal{O}$$

and find that

$$\mathcal{Ext}^i(\mathcal{O}_X,\mathcal{F}) = h^i(\mathcal{Hom}(\mathcal{O}(-d) \to \mathcal{O}, \mathcal{F}))$$

==== Union of smooth complete intersections ====
Consider the scheme

$$X = \text{Proj}\left( \frac{\mathbb{C}[x_0,\ldots,x_n]}{(f)(g_1,g_2,g_3)} \right) \subseteq \mathbb{P}^n$$

where $(f,g_1,g_2,g_3)$ is a smooth complete intersection and $\deg(f) = d$, $\deg(g_i) = e_i$. We have a complex

$$\mathcal{O}(-d-e_1-e_2-e_3) \xrightarrow{\begin{bmatrix} g_3 \\ -g_2 \\ -g_1 \end{bmatrix}} \begin{matrix} \mathcal{O}(-d-e_1-e_2) \\ \oplus \\ \mathcal{O}(-d-e_1-e_3) \\ \oplus \\ \mathcal{O}(-d-e_2-e_3) \end{matrix} \xrightarrow{\begin{bmatrix} g_2 & g_3 & 0 \\ -g_1 & 0 & -g_3 \\ 0 & -g_1 & g_2 \end{bmatrix}} \begin{matrix} \mathcal{O}(-d-e_1) \\ \oplus \\ \mathcal{O}(-d-e_2) \\ \oplus \\ \mathcal{O}(-d-e_3)  \end{matrix} \xrightarrow{\begin{bmatrix} fg_1 & fg_2 & fg_3 \end{bmatrix}} \mathcal{O}$$

resolving $\mathcal{O}_X,$ which we can use to compute $\mathcal{Ext}^i(\mathcal{O}_X,\mathcal{F})$.

== See also ==
- D-module (in place of O, one can also consider D, the sheaf of differential operators.)
- fractional ideal
- holomorphic vector bundle
- generic freeness
