= Associated sheaf =

Associated sheaf may refer to:

- Sheaf associated to a presheaf
- Sheaf associated to a module
