= Orientation character =

Classifier of orientation-preserving loops in a topological space

In algebraic topology, a branch of mathematics, an orientation character on a group $\pi$ is a group homomorphism to the group of two elements

$$\omega\colon \pi \to \left\{\pm 1\right\}$$,

where typically $\pi$ is the fundamental group of a manifold. This notion is of particular significance in surgery theory.

== Motivation ==
Given a manifold M, one takes $\pi=\pi_1( M)$ (the fundamental group), and then $\omega$ sends an element of $\pi$ to $-1$ if and only if the class it represents is orientation-reversing.

This map $\omega$ is trivial if and only if M is orientable.

The orientation character is an algebraic structure on the fundamental group of a manifold, which captures which loops are orientation reversing and which are orientation preserving.

== Twisted group algebra ==
The orientation character defines a twisted involution (*-ring structure) on the group ring $\mathbf{Z}[\pi]$, by $g \mapsto \omega(g)g^{-1}$ (i.e., $\pm g^{-1}$, accordingly as $g$ is orientation preserving or reversing). This is denoted $\mathbf{Z}[\pi]^\omega$.

== Examples ==
- In real projective spaces, the orientation character evaluates trivially on loops if the dimension is odd, and assigns -1 to noncontractible loops in even dimension.

== Properties ==
The orientation character is either trivial or has as its kernel an index 2 subgroup, which determines the map completely.

== See also ==
- Characteristic class
- Local system
- Twisted Poincaré duality
