= Base change =

In mathematics, base change may mean:

- Base change map in algebraic geometry
- Fiber product of schemes in algebraic geometry
- Change of base (disambiguation) in linear algebra or numeral systems
- Base change lifting of automorphic forms
