= Germ (mathematics) =

Equivalence class of objects sharing local properties at a point in a topological space

In mathematics, the notion of a germ of an object in/on a topological space is an equivalence class of that object and others of the same kind that captures their shared local properties. In particular, the objects in question are mostly functions (or maps) and subsets. In specific implementations of this idea, the functions or subsets in question will have some property, such as being analytic or smooth, but in general this is not needed (the functions in question need not even be continuous); it is however necessary that the space on/in which the object is defined is a topological space, in order that the word local has some meaning.

== Name ==
The name is derived from cereal germ in a continuation of the sheaf metaphor, as a germ is (locally) the "heart" of a function, as it is for a grain.

== Formal definition ==
=== Basic definition ===
Given a point $x$ of a topological space $X$ and two maps $f, g: X \to Y$ (where $Y$ is any set), then $f$ and $g$ define the same germ at $x$ if there is a neighbourhood $U$ of $x$ such that restricted to $U$, $f$ and $g$ are equal; meaning that $f(u)=g(u)$ for all $u$ in $U$.

For a pair of subsets $S$ and $T$ on $X$, the germs of $S$ and $T$ coincide as congruence classes if there is a neighborhood $U$ of $x$ so that

$S \cap U=T \cap U$.

This can be understood as an application of the basic definition above, by identifying $S$ and $T$ with their respective indicator functions, $\mathbf{1}_S:X \rightarrow \{0,1\}$ and $\mathbf{1}_T:X \rightarrow \{0,1\}$.

It is straightforward to see that defining the same germ at $x$ is an equivalence relation (be it on maps or sets), and the equivalence classes are called germs (map-germs, or set-germs accordingly). The equivalence relation is usually written

$$f \sim_x g \quad \text{or} \quad S \sim_x T.$$

Given a map f on X, its germ at x is usually denoted [f]_{x}. Similarly, the germ at x of a set S is written [S]_{x}. Thus,

$$[f]_x = \{g:X\to Y \mid g \sim_x f\}.$$

A map germ at x in X that maps the point x in X to the point y in Y is denoted as

$$f:(X,x) \to (Y,y).$$

When using this notation, f is then intended as an entire equivalence class of maps, using the same letter f for any representative map.

Notice that two sets are germ-equivalent at x if and only if their characteristic functions are germ-equivalent at x:

$$S\sim_x T \Longleftrightarrow \mathbf{1}_S \sim_x \mathbf{1}_T.$$

=== More generally ===
Maps need not be defined on all of X, and in particular they don't need to have the same domain. However, if f has domain S and g has domain T, both subsets of X, then f and g are germ equivalent at x in X if first S and T are germ equivalent at x, say $S \cap U = T\cap U \neq \emptyset,$ and then moreover $f|_{S\cap V} = g|_{T\cap V}$, for some smaller neighbourhood V with $x\in V \subseteq U$. This is particularly relevant in two settings:

1. f is defined on a subvariety V of X, and
2. f has a pole of some sort at x, so is not even defined at x, as for example a rational function, which would be defined off a subvariety.

=== Basic properties ===
If f and g are germ equivalent at x, then they share all local properties, such as continuity, differentiability etc., so it makes sense to talk about a differentiable or analytic germ, etc. Similarly for subsets: if one representative of a germ is an analytic set then so are all representatives, at least on some neighbourhood of x.

Algebraic structures on the target Y are inherited by the set of germs with values in Y. For instance, if the target Y is a group, then it makes sense to multiply germs: to define [f]_{x}[g]_{x}, first take representatives f and g, defined on neighbourhoods U and V respectively, and define [f]_{x}[g]_{x} to be the germ at x of the pointwise product map fg (which is defined on $U\cap V$). In the same way, if Y is an abelian group, vector space, or ring, then so is the set of germs.

The set of germs at x of maps from X to Y does not have a useful topology, except for the discrete one. It therefore makes little or no sense to talk of a convergent sequence of germs. However, if X and Y are manifolds, then the spaces of jets $J_x^k(X,Y)$ (finite order Taylor series at x of map(-germs)) do have topologies as they can be identified with finite-dimensional vector spaces.

== Relation with sheaves ==
The idea of germs is behind the definition of sheaves and presheaves. A presheaf $\mathcal{F}$ of abelian groups on a topological space X assigns an abelian group $\mathcal{F}(U)$ to each open set U in X. Typical examples of abelian groups here are: real-valued functions on U, differential forms on U, vector fields on U, holomorphic functions on U (when X is a complex manifold), constant functions on U and differential operators on U.

If $V \subseteq U$ then there is a restriction map $\mathrm{res}_{VU}:\mathcal{F}(U)\to \mathcal{F}(V),$ satisfying certain compatibility conditions. For a fixed x, one says that elements $f\in\mathcal{F}(U)$ and $g\in \mathcal{F}(V)$ are equivalent at x if there is a neighbourhood $W\subseteq U\cap V$ of x with res_{WU}(f) = res_{WV}(g) (both elements of $\mathcal{F}(W)$). The equivalence classes form the stalk $\mathcal{F}_x$ at x of the presheaf $\mathcal{F}$. This equivalence relation is an abstraction of the germ equivalence described above.

Interpreting germs through sheaves also gives a general explanation for the presence of algebraic structures on sets of germs. The reason is that formation of stalks preserves finite limits. This implies that if T is a Lawvere theory and a sheaf F is a T-algebra, then any stalk F_{x} is also a T-algebra.

== Examples ==
If $X$ and $Y$ have additional structure, it is possible to define subsets of the set of all maps from X to Y or more generally sub-presheaves of a given presheaf $\mathcal{F}$ and corresponding germs: some notable examples follow.

- If $X, Y$ are both topological spaces, the subset

$$C^0(X,Y) \subseteq \mbox{Hom}(X,Y)$$

of continuous functions defines germs of continuous functions.

- If both $X$ and $Y$ admit a differentiable structure, the subset

$$C^k(X,Y) \subseteq \mbox{Hom}(X,Y)$$

of $k$-times continuously differentiable functions, the subset

$$C^\infty(X,Y)=\bigcap\nolimits_k C^k(X,Y)\subseteq \mbox{Hom}(X,Y)$$

of smooth functions and the subset

$$C^\omega(X,Y)\subseteq \mbox{Hom}(X,Y)$$

of analytic functions can be defined ($\omega$ here is the ordinal for infinity; this is an abuse of notation, by analogy with $C^k$ and $C^{\infty}$), and then spaces of germs of (finitely) differentiable, smooth, analytic functions can be constructed.

- If $X,Y$ have a complex structure (for instance, are subsets of complex vector spaces), holomorphic functions between them can be defined, and therefore spaces of germs of holomorphic functions can be constructed.
- If $X,Y$ have an algebraic structure, then regular (and rational) functions between them can be defined, and germs of regular functions (and likewise rational) can be defined.
- The germ of$f : \mathbb{R} \rarr Y$ at positive infinity (or simply the germ of f) is $\{g: \exists x \forall y > x \, f(y) = g(y)\}$. These germs are used in asymptotic analysis and Hardy fields.

=== Notation ===
The stalk of a sheaf $\mathcal{F}$ on a topological space $X$ at a point $x$ of $X$ is commonly denoted by $\mathcal{F}_x.$ As a consequence, germs, constituting stalks of sheaves of various kind of functions, borrow this scheme of notation:

- $\mathcal{C}_x^0$ is the space of germs of continuous functions at $x$.
- $\mathcal{C}_x^k$ for each natural number $k$ is the space of germs of $k$-times-differentiable functions at $x$.
- $\mathcal{C}_x^\infty$ is the space of germs of infinitely differentiable ("smooth") functions at $x$.
- $\mathcal{C}_x^\omega$ is the space of germs of analytic functions at $x$.
- $\mathcal{O}_x$ is the space of germs of holomorphic functions (in complex geometry), or space of germs of regular functions (in algebraic geometry) at $x$.

For germs of sets and varieties, the notation is not so well established: some notations found in literature include:

- $\mathfrak{V}_x$ is the space of germs of analytic varieties at $x$. When the point $x$ is fixed and known (e.g. when $X$ is a topological vector space and $x=0$), it can be dropped in each of the above symbols: also, when $\dim X=n$, a subscript before the symbol can be added. As example
- ${_n\mathcal{C}^0}, {_n\mathcal{C}^k}, {_n\mathcal{C}^\infty}, {_n\mathcal{C}^\omega}, {_n\mathcal{O}}, {_n\mathfrak{V}}$ are the spaces of germs shown above when $X$ is a $n$-dimensional vector space and $x=0$.

== Applications ==
The key word in the applications of germs is locality: all local properties of a function at a point can be studied by analyzing its germ. They are a generalization of Taylor series, and indeed the Taylor series of a germ (of a differentiable function) is defined: you only need local information to compute derivatives.

Germs are useful in determining the properties of dynamical systems near chosen points of their phase space: they are one of the main tools in singularity theory and catastrophe theory.

When the topological spaces considered are Riemann surfaces or more generally complex analytic varieties, germs of holomorphic functions on them can be viewed as power series, and thus the set of germs can be considered to be the analytic continuation of an analytic function.

Germs can also be used in the definition of tangent vectors in differential geometry. A tangent vector can be viewed as a point-derivation on the algebra of germs at that point.

== Algebraic properties ==
As noted earlier, sets of germs may have algebraic structures such as being rings. In many situations, rings of germs are not arbitrary rings but instead have quite specific properties.

Suppose that X is a space of some sort. It is often the case that, at each x ∈ X, the ring of germs of functions at x is a local ring. This is the case, for example, for continuous functions on a topological space; for k-times differentiable, smooth, or analytic functions on a real manifold (when such functions are defined); for holomorphic functions on a complex manifold; and for regular functions on an algebraic variety. The property that rings of germs are local rings is axiomatized by the theory of locally ringed spaces.

The types of local rings that arise, however, depend closely on the theory under consideration. The Weierstrass preparation theorem implies that rings of germs of holomorphic functions are Noetherian rings. It can also be shown that these are regular rings. On the other hand, let $\mathcal{C}_0^\infty(\mathbf{R})$ be the ring of germs at the origin of smooth functions on R. This ring is local but not Noetherian. To see why, observe that the maximal ideal m of this ring consists of all germs that vanish at the origin, and the power m^{k} consists of those germs whose first k − 1 derivatives vanish. If this ring were Noetherian, then the Krull intersection theorem would imply that a smooth function whose Taylor series vanished would be the zero function. But this is false, as can be seen by considering

$$f(x) = \begin{cases}
e^{-1/x^2}, &x \neq 0, \\
0, &x = 0.
\end{cases}$$

This ring is also not a unique factorization domain. This is because all UFDs satisfy the ascending chain condition on principal ideals, but there is an infinite ascending chain of principal ideals

$$\cdots \subsetneq (x^{-j+1} f(x)) \subsetneq (x^{-j} f(x)) \subsetneq (x^{-j-1} f(x)) \subsetneq \cdots.$$

The inclusions are strict because x is in the maximal ideal m.

The ring $\mathcal{C}_0^0(\mathbf{R})$ of germs at the origin of continuous functions on R even has the property that its maximal ideal m satisfies m^{2} = m. Any germ f ∈ m can be written as

$$f = |f|^{1/2} \cdot \big(\operatorname{sgn}(f)|f|^{1/2}\big),$$

where sgn is the sign function. Since |f| vanishes at the origin, this expresses f as the product of two functions in m, whence the conclusion. This is related to the setup of almost ring theory.

== See also ==
- Analytic variety
- Catastrophe theory
- Gluing axiom
- Riemann surface
- Sheaf
- Stalk
