= De Rham–Weil theorem =

In algebraic topology, the De Rham–Weil theorem allows computation of sheaf cohomology using an acyclic resolution of the sheaf in question.

Let $\mathcal F$ be a sheaf on a topological space $X$ and $\mathcal F^\bullet$ a resolution of $\mathcal F$ by acyclic sheaves. Then

$$H^q(X,\mathcal F) \cong H^q(\mathcal F^\bullet(X)),$$

where $H^q(X,\mathcal F)$ denotes the $q$-th sheaf cohomology group of $X$ with coefficients in $\mathcal F.$

The De Rham–Weil theorem follows from the more general fact that derived functors may be computed using acyclic resolutions instead of simply injective resolutions.

== See also ==
- de Rham theorem
