= Cotangent sheaf =

In algebraic geometry, given a morphism f: X → S of schemes, the cotangent sheaf on X is the sheaf of $\mathcal{O}_X$-modules $\Omega_{X/S}$ that represents (or classifies) S-derivations in the sense: for any $\mathcal{O}_X$-modules F, there is an isomorphism

$$\operatorname{Hom}_{\mathcal{O}_X}(\Omega_{X/S}, F) = \operatorname{Der}_S(\mathcal{O}_X, F)$$

that depends naturally on F. In other words, the cotangent sheaf is characterized by the universal property: there is the differential $d: \mathcal{O}_X \to \Omega_{X/S}$ such that any S-derivation $D: \mathcal{O}_X \to F$ factors as $D = \alpha \circ d$ with some $\alpha: \Omega_{X/S} \to F$.

In the case X and S are affine schemes, the above definition means that $\Omega_{X/S}$ is the module of Kähler differentials. The standard way to construct a cotangent sheaf (e.g., Hartshorne, Ch II. § 8) is through a diagonal morphism (which amounts to gluing modules of Kähler differentials on affine charts to get the globally defined cotangent sheaf). The dual module of the cotangent sheaf on a scheme X is called the tangent sheaf on X and is sometimes denoted by $\Theta_X$.

There are two important exact sequences:

1. If S →T is a morphism of schemes, then
  $$f^* \Omega_{S/T} \to \Omega_{X/T} \to \Omega_{X/S} \to 0.$$
2. If Z is a closed subscheme of X with ideal sheaf I, then
  $I/I^2 \to \Omega_{X/S} \otimes_{O_X} \mathcal{O}_Z \to \Omega_{Z/S} \to 0.$

The cotangent sheaf is closely related to smoothness of a variety or scheme. For example, an algebraic variety is smooth of dimension n if and only if Ω_{X} is a locally free sheaf of rank n.

== Construction through a diagonal morphism ==
Let $f: X \to S$ be a morphism of schemes as in the introduction and Δ: X → X ×_{S} X the diagonal morphism. Then the image of Δ is locally closed; i.e., closed in some open subset W of X ×_{S} X (the image is closed if and only if f is separated). Let I be the ideal sheaf of Δ(X) in W. One then puts:

$$\Omega_{X/S} = \Delta^* (I/I^2)$$

and checks this sheaf of modules satisfies the required universal property of a cotangent sheaf (Hartshorne, Ch II. Remark 8.9.2). The construction shows in particular that the cotangent sheaf is quasi-coherent. It is coherent if S is Noetherian and f is of finite type.

The above definition means that the cotangent sheaf on X is the restriction to X of the conormal sheaf to the diagonal embedding of X over S.

== Relation to a tautological line bundle ==
The cotangent sheaf on a projective space is related to the tautological line bundle O(-1) by the following exact sequence: writing $\mathbf{P}^n_R$ for the projective space over a ring R,

$$0 \to \Omega_{\mathbf{P}^n_R/R} \to \mathcal{O}_{\mathbf{P}^n_R}(-1)^{\oplus(n+1)} \to \mathcal{O}_{\mathbf{P}^n_R} \to 0.$$

(See also Chern class#Complex projective space.)

== Cotangent stack ==
For this notion, see § 1 of

A. Beilinson and V. Drinfeld, Quantization of Hitchin’s integrable system and Hecke eigensheaves

There, the cotangent stack on an algebraic stack X is defined as the relative Spec of the symmetric algebra of the tangent sheaf on X. (Note: in general, if E is a locally free sheaf of finite rank, $\mathbf{Spec}(\operatorname{Sym}(\check{E}))$ is the algebraic vector bundle corresponding to E.)

See also: Hitchin fibration (the cotangent stack of $\operatorname{Bun}_G(X)$ is the total space of the Hitchin fibration.)

== See also ==
- Canonical sheaf
- Cotangent complex
