= Seesaw theorem =

In algebraic geometry, the seesaw theorem, or seesaw principle, says roughly that a limit of trivial line bundles over complete varieties is a trivial line bundle. It was introduced by André Weil in a course at the University of Chicago in 1954–1955, and is related to Severi's theory of correspondences.

The seesaw theorem is proved using proper base change. It can be used to prove the theorem of the cube.

== Statement ==
Lang (1959, p.241) originally stated the seesaw principle in terms of divisors. It is now more common to state it in terms of line bundles as follows (Mumford 2008, Corollary 6, section 5). Suppose L is a line bundle over X×T, where X is a complete variety and T is an algebraic set. Then the set of points t of T such that L is trivial on X×t is closed. Moreover if this set is the whole of T then L is the pullback of a line bundle on T. Mumford (2008, section 10) also gave a more precise version, showing that there is a largest closed subscheme of T such that L is the pullback of a line bundle on the subscheme.
