= Injective sheaf =

Mathematical object in sheaf cohomology

In mathematics, injective sheaves of abelian groups are used to construct the resolutions needed to define sheaf cohomology (and other derived functors, such as sheaf Ext).

There is a further group of related concepts applied to sheaves: flabby (flasque in French), fine, soft (mou in French), acyclic. In the history of the subject they were introduced before the 1957 "Tohoku paper" of Alexander Grothendieck, which showed that the abelian category notion of injective object sufficed to found the theory. The other classes of sheaves are historically older notions. The abstract framework for defining cohomology and derived functors does not need them. However, in most concrete situations, resolutions by acyclic sheaves are often easier to construct. Acyclic sheaves therefore serve for computational purposes, for example the Leray spectral sequence.

== Injective sheaves ==
An injective sheaf $\mathcal{F}$ is a sheaf that is an injective object of the category of abelian sheaves; in other words, homomorphisms from $\mathcal{A}$ to $\mathcal{F}$ can always be extended to any sheaf $\mathcal{B}$ containing $\mathcal{A}.$

The category of abelian sheaves has enough injective objects: this means that any sheaf is a subsheaf of an injective sheaf. This result of Grothendieck follows from the existence of a generator of the category (it can be written down explicitly, and is related to the subobject classifier). This is enough to show that right derived functors of any left exact functor exist and are unique up to canonical isomorphism.

For technical purposes, injective sheaves are usually superior to the other classes of sheaves mentioned above: they can do almost anything the other classes can do, and their theory is simpler and more general. In fact, injective sheaves are flabby (flasque), soft, and acyclic. However, there are situations where the other classes of sheaves occur naturally, and this is especially true in concrete computational situations.

The dual concept, projective sheaves, is not used much, because in a general category of sheaves there are not enough of them: not every sheaf is the quotient of a projective sheaf, and in particular projective resolutions do not always exist. This is the case, for example, when looking at the category of sheaves on projective space in the Zariski topology. This causes problems when attempting to define left derived functors of a right exact functor (such as Tor). This can sometimes be done by ad hoc means: for example, the left derived functors of Tor can be defined using a flat resolution rather than a projective one, but it takes some work to show that this is independent of the resolution. Not all categories of sheaves run into this problem; for instance, the category of sheaves on an affine scheme contains enough projectives.

== Acyclic sheaves ==
An acyclic sheaf $\mathcal{F}$ over X is one such that all higher sheaf cohomology groups vanish. That is, $H^j(X,\mathcal{F}) = 0$ for all j > 0.

The cohomology groups of any sheaf can be calculated from any acyclic resolution of it (this goes by the name of De Rham-Weil theorem).

== Fine sheaves ==
A fine sheaf over X is one with "partitions of unity"; more precisely for any open cover of the space X we can find a family of homomorphisms from the sheaf to itself with sum 1 such that each homomorphism is 0 outside some element of the open cover.

Fine sheaves are usually only used over paracompact Hausdorff spaces X. Typical examples are the sheaf of germs of continuous real-valued functions over such a space, or smooth functions over a smooth (paracompact Hausdorff) manifold, or modules over these sheaves of rings. Also, fine sheaves over paracompact Hausdorff spaces are soft and acyclic.

One can find a resolution of a sheaf on a smooth manifold by fine sheaves using the Alexander–Spanier resolution.

As an application, consider a real manifold X. There is the following resolution of the constant sheaf $\R$ by the fine sheaves of (smooth) differential forms:

$$0\to\R\to C^0_X \to C^1_X \to \cdots \to C^{\dim X}_X \to 0.$$

This is a resolution, i.e. an exact complex of sheaves, by the Poincaré lemma. The cohomology of X with values in $\R$ can thus be computed as the cohomology of the complex of globally defined differential forms:

$$H^i(X,\R) = H^i(C^\bullet_X(X)).$$

== Soft sheaves ==
A soft sheaf $\mathcal{F}$ over X is one such that any section over any closed subset of X can be extended to a global section.

Soft sheaves are acyclic over paracompact Hausdorff spaces.

== Flasque or flabby sheaves ==
A flasque sheaf (also called a flabby sheaf) is a sheaf $\mathcal{F}$ with the following property: if $X$ is the base topological space on which the sheaf is defined and

$$U \subseteq V \subseteq X$$

are open subsets, then the restriction map

$$r_{U \subseteq V} : \Gamma(V, \mathcal{F}) \to \Gamma(U, \mathcal{F})$$

is surjective, as a map of groups (rings, modules, etc.).

Flasque sheaves are useful because (by definition) their sections extend. This means that they are some of the simplest sheaves to handle in terms of homological algebra. Any sheaf has a canonical embedding into the flasque sheaf of all possibly discontinuous sections of the étalé space, and by repeating this we can find a canonical flasque resolution for any sheaf. Flasque resolutions, that is, resolutions by means of flasque sheaves, are one approach to defining sheaf cohomology.

Flasque sheaves are soft and acyclic.

Flasque is a French word that has sometimes been translated into English as flabby.
