= Local system =

Locally constant sheaf of abelian groups on topological space

In mathematics, a local system (or a system of local coefficients) on a topological space X is a tool from algebraic topology which interpolates between cohomology with coefficients in a fixed abelian group A, and general sheaf cohomology in which coefficients vary from point to point. Local coefficient systems were introduced by Norman Steenrod in 1943.

Local systems are the building blocks of more general tools, such as constructible and perverse sheaves.

== Definition ==
Let X be a topological space. A local system (of abelian groups/modules...) on X is a locally constant sheaf (of abelian groups/of modules...) on X. In other words, a sheaf $\mathcal{L}$ is a local system if every point has an open neighborhood $U$ such that the restricted sheaf $\mathcal{L}|_U$ is isomorphic to the sheafification of some constant presheaf.

=== Locally constant sheaf ===
In algebraic topology, a locally constant sheaf on a topological space X is a sheaf $\mathcal{F}$ on X such that for each x in X, there is an open neighborhood U of x such that the restriction $\mathcal{F}|_U$ is a constant sheaf on U. It is also called a local system. When X is a stratified space, a constructible sheaf is roughly a sheaf that is locally constant on each member of the stratification.

A basic example is the orientation sheaf on a manifold since each point of the manifold admits an orientable open neighborhood (while the manifold itself may not be orientable).

For another example, let $X = \mathbb{C}$, $\mathcal{O}_X$ be the sheaf of holomorphic functions on X and $P: \mathcal{O}_X \to \mathcal{O}_X$ given by $P = z {\partial \over \partial z} - {1 \over 2}$. Then the kernel of P is a locally constant sheaf on $X - \{0\}$ but not constant there (since it has no nonzero global section).

If $\mathcal{F}$ is a locally constant sheaf of sets on a space X, then each path $p: [0, 1] \to X$ in X determines a bijection $\mathcal{F}_{p(0)} \overset{\sim}\to \mathcal{F}_{p(1)}.$ Moreover, two homotopic paths determine the same bijection. Hence, there is the well-defined functor

$$\Pi_1 X \to \mathbf{Set}, \, x \mapsto \mathcal{F}_x$$

where $\Pi_1 X$ is the fundamental groupoid of X: the category whose objects are points of X and whose morphisms are homotopy classes of paths. Moreover, if X is path-connected, locally path-connected and semi-locally simply connected (so X has a universal cover), then every functor $\Pi_1 X \to \mathbf{Set}$ is of the above form; i.e., the functor category $\mathbf{Fct}(\Pi_1 X, \mathbf{Set})$ is equivalent to the category of locally constant sheaves on X.

If X is locally connected, the adjunction between the category of presheaves and bundles restricts to an equivalence between the category of locally constant sheaves and the category of covering spaces of X.

=== Equivalent definitions ===
==== Path-connected spaces ====
If X is path-connected, a local system $\mathcal{L}$ of abelian groups has the same stalk $L$ at every point. There is a bijective correspondence between local systems on X and group homomorphisms

$$\rho: \pi_1(X,x) \to \text{Aut}(L)$$

and similarly for local systems of modules. The map $\pi_1(X,x) \to \text{Aut}(L)$ giving the local system $\mathcal{L}$ is called the monodromy representation of $\mathcal{L}$.

Proof of equivalence

Take local system $\mathcal{L}$ and a loop $\gamma$ at x. It's easy to show that any local system on $[0,1]$ is constant. For instance, $\gamma^* \mathcal{L}$ is constant. This gives an isomorphism $(\gamma^*\mathcal{L})_0\simeq \Gamma([0,1], \mathcal{L}) \simeq (\gamma^*\mathcal{L})_1$, i.e. between $L$ and itself. Conversely, given a homomorphism $\rho: \pi_1(X,x)\to \text{Aut}(L)$, consider the constant sheaf $\underline{L}$ on the universal cover $\widetilde{X}$ of X. The deck-transform-invariant sections of $\underline{L}$ gives a local system on X. Similarly, the deck-transform-ρ-equivariant sections give another local system on X: for a small enough open set U, it is defined as

$$\mathcal{L}(\rho)_U\ = \  \left\{ \text{sections }s \in \underline{L}_{\pi^{-1}(U)} \text{ with }\theta\circ s=\rho(\theta) s \text{ for all }\theta \in\text{ Deck}(\widetilde{X}/X)=\pi_1(X,x)   \right\}$$

where $\pi:\widetilde{X}\to X$ is the universal covering.

This shows that (for X path-connected) a local system is precisely a sheaf whose pullback to the universal cover of X is a constant sheaf.

This correspondence can be upgraded to an equivalence of categories between the category of local systems of abelian groups on X and the category of abelian groups endowed with an action of $\pi_1(X,x)$ (equivalently, $\mathbb{Z}[\pi_1(X,x)]$-modules).

==== Stronger definition on non-connected spaces ====
A stronger nonequivalent definition that works for non-connected X is the following: a local system is a covariant functor

$$\mathcal{L}\colon \Pi_1(X) \to \textbf{Mod}(R)$$

from the fundamental groupoid of $X$ to the category of modules over a commutative ring $R$, where typically $R = \Q,\R,\Complex$. This is equivalently the data of an assignment to every point $x\in X$ a module $M$ along with a group representation $\rho_x: \pi_1(X,x) \to \text{Aut}_R(M)$ such that the various $\rho_x$ are compatible with change of basepoint $x \to y$ and the induced map $\pi_1(X, x) \to \pi_1(X, y)$ on fundamental groups.

== Examples ==
- Constant sheaves such as $\underline{\Q}_X$. This is a useful tool for computing cohomology since in good situations(e.g. paracompact Hausdorff space which is locally contractible), there is an isomorphism between sheaf cohomology and singular cohomology:

$$H^k(X,\underline{\Q}_X) \cong H^k_\text{sing}(X,\Q)$$

- Let $X=\R^2 \setminus \{(0,0)\}$. Since $\pi_1(\R^2 \setminus \{(0,0)\})=\mathbb{Z}$, there is an $S^1$ family of local systems on X corresponding to the maps $n \mapsto e^{in\theta}$:

$$\rho_\theta: \pi_1(X; x_0) \cong \Z \to \text{Aut}_\Complex(\Complex)$$

- Horizontal sections of vector bundles with a flat connection. If $E\to X$ is a vector bundle with flat connection $\nabla$, then there is a local system given by
  $$E^\nabla_U=\left\{\text{sections }s\in \Gamma(U,E) \text{ which are horizontal: }\nabla s=0\right\}$$
  For instance, take $X=\Complex \setminus 0$ and $E = X \times \Complex^n$, the trivial bundle. Sections of E are n-tuples of functions on X, so $\nabla_0(f_1,\dots,f_n)= (df_1,\dots,df_n)$ defines a flat connection on E, as does $\nabla(f_1,\dots,f_n)= (df_1,\dots,df_n)-\Theta(x)(f_1,\dots,f_n)^t$ for any matrix of one-forms $\Theta$ on X. The horizontal sections are then

$$E^\nabla_U= \left\{(f_1,\dots,f_n)\in E_U: (df_1,\dots,df_n)=\Theta (f_1,\dots,f_n)^t\right\}$$
i.e., the solutions to the linear differential equation $df_i = \sum \Theta_{ij} f_j$.

If $\Theta$ extends to a one-form on $\Complex$ the above will also define a local system on $\Complex$, so will be trivial since $\pi_1(\Complex) = 0$. So to give an interesting example, choose one with a pole at 0:

$$\Theta= \begin{pmatrix} 0 & dx/x  \\ dx & e^x dx \end{pmatrix}$$
in which case for $\nabla= d+ \Theta$,
$$E^\nabla_U =\left\{ f_1,f_2: U \to \mathbb{C} \ \ \text{ with } f'_1= f_2/x \ \ f_2'=f_1+ e^x f_2\right\}$$

- An n-sheeted covering map $X\to Y$ is a local system with fibers given by the set $\{1,\dots,n\}$. Similarly, a fibre bundle with discrete fibre is a local system, because each path lifts uniquely to a given lift of its basepoint. (The definition adjusts to include set-valued local systems in the obvious way).
- A local system of k-vector spaces on X is equivalent to a k-linear representation of $\pi_1(X,x)$.
- If X is a variety, local systems are the same thing as D-modules which are additionally coherent O_X-modules (see O modules).
- If the connection is not flat (i.e. its curvature is nonzero), then parallel transport of a fibre F_x over x around a contractible loop based at x_0 may give a nontrivial automorphism of F_x, so locally constant sheaves can not necessarily be defined for non-flat connections.
- The Gauss–Manin connection is a prominent example of a connection whose horizontal sections are studied in relation to variation of Hodge structures.

== Cohomology ==
There are several ways to define the cohomology of a local system, called cohomology with local coefficients, which become equivalent under mild assumptions on X.

- Given a locally constant sheaf $\mathcal{L}$ of abelian groups on X, we have the sheaf cohomology groups $H^j(X,\mathcal{L})$ with coefficients in $\mathcal{L}$.
- Given a locally constant sheaf $\mathcal{L}$ of abelian groups on X, let $C^n(X;\mathcal{L})$ be the group of all functions f which map each singular n-simplex $\sigma\colon\Delta^n\to X$ to a global section $f(\sigma)$ of the inverse-image sheaf $\sigma^{-1}\mathcal{L}$. These groups can be made into a cochain complex with differentials constructed as in usual singular cohomology. Define $H^j_\mathrm{sing}(X;\mathcal{L})$ to be the cohomology of this complex.
- The group $C_n(\widetilde{X})$ of singular n-chains on the universal cover of X has an action of $\pi_1(X,x)$ by deck transformations. Explicitly, a deck transformation $\gamma\colon\widetilde{X}\to\widetilde{X}$ takes a singular n-simplex $\sigma\colon\Delta^n\to\widetilde{X}$ to $\gamma\circ\sigma$. Then, given an abelian group L equipped with an action of $\pi_1(X,x)$, one can form a cochain complex from the groups $\operatorname{Hom}_{\pi_1(X,x)}(C_n(\widetilde{X}),L)$ of $\pi_1(X,x)$-equivariant homomorphisms as above. Define $H^j_\mathrm{sing}(X;L)$ to be the cohomology of this complex.

If X is paracompact and locally contractible, then $H^j(X,\mathcal{L})\cong H^j_\mathrm{sing}(X;\mathcal{L})$. If $\mathcal{L}$ is the local system corresponding to L, then there is an identification $C^n(X;\mathcal{L})\cong\operatorname{Hom}_{\pi_1(X,x)}(C_n(\widetilde{X}),L)$ compatible with the differentials, so $H^j_\mathrm{sing}(X;\mathcal{L})\cong H^j_\mathrm{sing}(X;L)$.

== Generalization ==
Local systems have a mild generalization to constructible sheaves -- a constructible sheaf on a locally path connected topological space $X$ is a sheaf $\mathcal{L}$ such that there exists a stratification of

$$X = \coprod X_\lambda$$

where $\mathcal{L}|_{X_\lambda}$ is a local system. These are typically found by taking the cohomology of the derived pushforward for some continuous map $f:X \to Y$. For example, if we look at the complex points of the morphism

$$f:X = \text{Proj}\left(\frac{\Complex[s,t][x,y,z]}{(st\cdot h(x,y,z))}\right) \to \text{Spec}(\Complex[s,t])$$

then the fibers over

$$\mathbb{A}^2_{s,t} - \mathbb{V}(st)$$

are the plane curve given by $h$, but the fibers over $\mathbb{V}= \mathbb{V}(st)$ are $\mathbb{P}^2$. If we take the derived pushforward $\mathbf{R}f_!(\underline{\Q}_X)$ then we get a constructible sheaf. Over $\mathbb{V}$ we have the local systems

$$\begin{align}
\mathbf{R}^0f_!(\underline{\mathbb{Q}}_X)|_{\mathbb{V}(st)} &= \underline{\Q}_{\mathbb{V}(st)} \\
\mathbf{R}^2f_!(\underline{\mathbb{Q}}_X)|_{\mathbb{V}(st)} &= \underline{\Q}_{\mathbb{V}(st)} \\
\mathbf{R}^4f_!(\underline{\mathbb{Q}}_X)|_{\mathbb{V}(st)} &= \underline{\Q}_{\mathbb{V}(st)} \\
\mathbf{R}^kf_!(\underline{\mathbb{Q}}_X)|_{\mathbb{V}(st)} &= \underline{0}_{\mathbb{V}(st)} \text{ otherwise}
\end{align}$$

while over $\mathbb{A}^2_{s,t} - \mathbb{V}(st)$ we have the local systems

$$\begin{align}
\mathbf{R}^0f_!(\underline{\Q}_X)|_{\mathbb{A}^2_{s,t} - \mathbb{V}(st)} &= \underline{\Q}_{\mathbb{A}^2_{s,t} - \mathbb{V}(st)} \\
\mathbf{R}^1f_!(\underline{\Q}_X)|_{\mathbb{A}^2_{s,t} - \mathbb{V}(st)} &= \underline{\Q}_{\mathbb{A}^2_{s,t} - \mathbb{V}(st)}^{\oplus 2g} \\
\mathbf{R}^2f_!(\underline{\Q}_X)|_{\mathbb{A}^2_{s,t} - \mathbb{V}(st)} &= \underline{\Q}_{\mathbb{A}^2_{s,t} - \mathbb{V}(st)} \\
\mathbf{R}^kf_!(\underline{\Q}_X)|_{\mathbb{A}^2_{s,t} - \mathbb{V}(st)} &= \underline{0}_{\mathbb{A}^2_{s,t} - \mathbb{V}(st)} \text{ otherwise}
\end{align}$$

where $g$ is the genus of the plane curve (which is $g = (\deg(f) - 1)(\deg(f) - 2)/2$).

== Applications ==
The cohomology with local coefficients in the module corresponding to the orientation covering can be used to formulate Poincaré duality for non-orientable manifolds: see Twisted Poincaré duality.

== See also ==
- Leray spectral sequence
- Gauss–Manin connection
- D-module
- Intersection homology
- Perverse sheaf
