= Theorem of the cube =

In algebraic geometry, the theorem of the cube is a condition for a line bundle over a product of three complete varieties to be trivial. It was first discovered in the context of linear equivalence by the Italian school of algebraic geometry. The modern version of the theorem was first published by Serge Lang, who credited it to André Weil. A treatment by means of sheaf cohomology, and description in terms of the Picard functor, was given by David Mumford.

== Statement ==
The theorem states that for any complete varieties $U$, $V$ and $W$ over an algebraically closed field, and given points $u$, $v$ and $w$ on them, any invertible sheaf $L$ which has a trivial restriction to each of $U\times V\times\{w\}$, $U\times \{v\}\times W$, and $\{u\}\times V\times W$ is itself trivial.

=== Special cases ===
On a ringed space $X$, an invertible sheaf $L$ is trivial if it is isomorphic to $\mathcal{O}_X$ as an $\mathcal{O}_X$-module. If the base $X$ is a complex manifold, then an invertible sheaf is (the sheaf of sections of) a holomorphic line bundle, and trivial means holomorphically equivalent to a trivial bundle, not just topologically equivalent.

=== Restatement using biextensions ===
Weil's result has been restated in terms of biextensions, a concept now generally used in the duality theory of abelian varieties.

== Theorem of the square ==
The theorem of the square is a corollary (also due to Weil) applying to an abelian variety $A$. One version of it states that the function $\phi_L$ taking $x\in A$ to $T_x^*L\otimes L^{-1}$ is a group homomorphism from $A$ to $\operatorname{Pic}(A)$ (where $T_x^*$ is translation by $x$ on line bundles).
