= Cohomology with compact support =

In mathematics, cohomology with compact support refers to certain cohomology theories, usually with some condition requiring that cocycles should have compact support.

== Singular cohomology with compact support ==
Let $X$ be a topological space. Then

$$\displaystyle H_c^\ast(X;R) := \varinjlim_{K\subseteq X \,\text{compact}} H^\ast(X,X\setminus K;R)$$

By definition, this is the cohomology of the sub–chain complex $C_c^\ast(X;R)$ consisting of all singular cochains $\phi: C_i(X;R)\to R$ that have compact support in the sense that there exists some compact $K\subseteq X$ such that $\phi$ vanishes on all chains in $X\setminus K$.

== Functorial definition ==
Let $X$ be a topological space and $p:X\to \star$ the map to the point. Using the direct image and direct image with compact support functors $p_*,p_!:\text{Sh}(X)\to \text{Sh}(\star)=\text{Ab}$, one can define cohomology and cohomology with compact support of a sheaf of abelian groups $\mathcal{F}$ on $X$ as

$$\displaystyle H^i(X,\mathcal{F})\ = \ R^ip_*\mathcal{F},$$
$$\displaystyle H^i_c(X,\mathcal{F})\ = \ R^ip_!\mathcal{F}.$$

Taking for $\mathcal{F}$ the constant sheaf with coefficients in a ring $R$ recovers the previous definition.

== de Rham cohomology with compact support for smooth manifolds ==
Given a manifold X, let $\Omega^k_{\mathrm c}(X)$ be the real vector space of k-forms on X with compact support, and d be the standard exterior derivative. Then the de Rham cohomology groups with compact support $H^q_{\mathrm c}(X)$ are the homology of the chain complex $(\Omega^\bullet_{\mathrm c}(X),d)$:

$$0 \to \Omega^0_{\mathrm c}(X) \to \Omega^1_{\mathrm c}(X) \to \Omega^2_{\mathrm c}(X) \to \cdots$$

i.e., $H^q_{\mathrm c}(X)$ is the vector space of closed q-forms modulo that of exact q-forms.

Despite their definition as the homology of an ascending complex, the de Rham groups with compact support demonstrate covariant behavior; for example, given the inclusion mapping j for an open set U of X, extension of forms on U to X (by defining them to be 0 on X–U) is a map $j_*: \Omega^\bullet_{\mathrm c}(U) \to \Omega^\bullet_{\mathrm c}(X)$ inducing a map

$$j_*: H^q_{\mathrm c}(U) \to H^q_{\mathrm c}(X)$$.

They also demonstrate contravariant behavior with respect to proper maps - that is, maps such that the inverse image of every compact set is compact. Let f: Y → X be such a map; then the pullback

$$f^*:
\Omega^q_{\mathrm c}(X) \to \Omega^q_{\mathrm c}(Y)
\sum_I g_I \, dx_{i_1} \wedge \ldots \wedge dx_{i_q} \mapsto
\sum_I(g_I \circ f) \, d(x_{i_1} \circ f) \wedge \ldots \wedge d(x_{i_q} \circ f)$$

induces a map

$$H^q_{\mathrm c}(X) \to H^q_{\mathrm c}(Y)$$.

If Z is a submanifold of X and U = X–Z is the complementary open set, there is a long exact sequence

$$\cdots \to H^q_{\mathrm c}(U) \overset{j_*}{\longrightarrow} H^q_{\mathrm c}(X) \overset{i^*}{\longrightarrow} H^q_{\mathrm c}(Z) \overset{\delta}{\longrightarrow} H^{q+1}_{\mathrm c}(U) \to \cdots$$

called the long exact sequence of cohomology with compact support. It has numerous applications, such as the Jordan curve theorem, which is obtained for X = R² and Z a simple closed curve in X.

De Rham cohomology with compact support satisfies a covariant Mayer–Vietoris sequence: if U and V are open sets covering X, then

$$\cdots \to H^q_{\mathrm c}(U \cap V) \to H^q_{\mathrm c}(U)\oplus H^q_{\mathrm c}(V) \to H^q_{\mathrm c}(X) \overset{\delta}{\longrightarrow} H^{q+1}_{\mathrm c}(U\cap V) \to \cdots$$

where all maps are induced by extension by zero is also exact.

== See also ==
- Borel–Moore homology
- Poincaré duality
- Constructible sheaf
- Derived category
