= Twisted Poincaré duality =

Extends Poincaré duality beyond oriented manifolds

In mathematics, the twisted Poincaré duality is a theorem removing the restriction on Poincaré duality to oriented manifolds. The existence of a global orientation is replaced by carrying along local information, by means of a local coefficient system.

== Twisted Poincaré duality for de Rham cohomology ==
Another version of the theorem with real coefficients features de Rham cohomology with values in the orientation bundle. This is the flat real line bundle denoted $o(M)$, that is trivialized by coordinate charts of the manifold $M$, with transition maps the sign of the Jacobian determinant of the charts transition maps. As a flat line bundle, it has a de Rham cohomology, denoted by

$H^* (M; \R^w)$ or $H^* (M; o(M))$.

For M a compact manifold, the top degree cohomology is equipped with a so-called trace morphism

$$\theta\colon H^d (M; o(M)) \to \R$$,

that is to be interpreted as integration on M, i.e., evaluating against the fundamental class.

Poincaré duality for differential forms is then the conjunction, for M connected, of the following two statements:

- The trace morphism is a linear isomorphism.
- The cup product, or exterior product of differential forms

$$\cup \colon H^* (M; \R)\otimes H^{d-*}(M, o(M)) \to H^d(M, o(M)) \simeq \R$$

is non-degenerate.

The oriented Poincaré duality is contained in this statement, as understood from the fact that the orientation bundle o(M) is trivial if the manifold is oriented, an orientation being a global trivialization, i.e., a nowhere vanishing parallel section.

== See also ==
- Local system
- Dualizing sheaf
- Verdier duality
