= Change of base =

In mathematics, change of base can mean any of several things:

- Changing numeral bases, such as converting from base 2 (binary) to base 10 (decimal). This is known as base conversion.
- The logarithmic change-of-base formula, one of the logarithmic identities used frequently in algebra and calculus.
- The method for changing between polynomial and normal bases, and similar transformations, for purposes of coding theory and cryptography.
- Construction of the fiber product of schemes, in algebraic geometry.

== See also ==
- Change of basis
- Base change (disambiguation)
