= Inverse image functor =

Construction in algebraic topology

In mathematics, specifically in algebraic topology and algebraic geometry, an inverse image functor is a contravariant construction of sheaves; here “contravariant” in the sense given a map $f : X \to Y$, the inverse image functor is a functor from the category of sheaves on Y to the category of sheaves on X. The direct image functor is the primary operation on sheaves, with the simplest definition. The inverse image exhibits some relatively subtle features.

== Definition ==
Suppose we are given a sheaf $\mathcal{G}$ on $Y$ and that we want to transport $\mathcal{G}$ to $X$ using a continuous map $f\colon X\to Y$.

We will call the result the inverse image or pullback sheaf $f^{-1}\mathcal{G}$. If we try to imitate the direct image by setting

$$f^{-1}\mathcal{G}(U) = \mathcal{G}(f(U))$$

for each open set $U$ of $X$, we immediately run into a problem: $f(U)$ is not necessarily open. The best we could do is to approximate it by open sets, and even then we will get a presheaf and not a sheaf. Consequently, we define $f^{-1}\mathcal{G}$ to be the sheaf associated to the presheaf:

$$U \mapsto \varinjlim_{V\supseteq f(U)}\mathcal{G}(V).$$

(Here $U$ is an open subset of $X$ and the colimit runs over all open subsets $V$ of $Y$ containing $f(U)$.)

For example, if $f$ is just the inclusion of a point $y$ of $Y$, then $f^{-1}(\mathcal{F})$ is just the stalk of $\mathcal{F}$ at this point.

The restriction maps, as well as the functoriality of the inverse image follows from the universal property of direct limits.

When dealing with morphisms $f\colon X\to Y$ of locally ringed spaces, for example schemes in algebraic geometry, one often works with sheaves of $\mathcal{O}_Y$-modules, where $\mathcal{O}_Y$ is the structure sheaf of $Y$. Then the functor $f^{-1}$ is inappropriate, because in general it does not even give sheaves of $\mathcal{O}_X$-modules. In order to remedy this, one defines in this situation for a sheaf of $\mathcal O_Y$-modules $\mathcal G$ its inverse image by

$$f^*\mathcal G := f^{-1}\mathcal{G} \otimes_{f^{-1}\mathcal{O}_Y} \mathcal{O}_X$$.

== Properties ==
- While $f^{-1}$ is more complicated to define than $f_{\ast}$, the stalks are easier to compute: given a point $x \in X$, one has $(f^{-1}\mathcal{G})_x \cong \mathcal{G}_{f(x)}$.
- $f^{-1}$ is an exact functor, as can be seen by the above calculation of the stalks.
- $f^*$ is (in general) only right exact. If $f^*$ is exact, f is called flat.
- $f^{-1}$ is the left adjoint of the direct image functor $f_{\ast}$. This implies that there are natural unit and counit morphisms $\mathcal{G} \rightarrow f_*f^{-1}\mathcal{G}$ and $f^{-1}f_*\mathcal{F} \rightarrow \mathcal{F}$. These morphisms yield a natural adjunction correspondence:

$$\mathrm{Hom}_{\mathbf {Sh}(X)}(f^{-1} \mathcal G, \mathcal F ) = \mathrm{Hom}_{\mathbf {Sh}(Y)}(\mathcal G, f_*\mathcal F)$$.

However, the morphisms $\mathcal{G} \rightarrow f_*f^{-1}\mathcal{G}$ and $f^{-1}f_*\mathcal{F} \rightarrow \mathcal{F}$ are almost never isomorphisms. For example, if $i\colon Z \to Y$ denotes the inclusion of a closed subset, the stalk of $i_* i^{-1} \mathcal G$ at a point $y \in Y$ is canonically isomorphic to $\mathcal G_y$ if $y$ is in $Z$ and $0$ otherwise. A similar adjunction holds for the case of sheaves of modules, replacing $i^{-1}$ by $i^*$.
