= Direct image functor =

In mathematics, a mapping between categories

In mathematics, the direct image functor describes how structured data assigned to one space can be systematically transferred to another space using a continuous map between them. More precisely, if we have a sheaf—an object that encodes data like functions or sections over open regions—defined on a space X, and a continuous map from X to another space Y, then the direct image functor produces a corresponding sheaf on Y. This construction is a central tool in sheaf theory and is widely used in topology and algebraic geometry to relate local data across spaces.

More formally, given a sheaf F defined on a topological space X and a continuous map f: X → Y, we can define a new sheaf f_{∗}F on Y, called the direct image sheaf or the pushforward sheaf of F along f, such that the global sections of f_{∗}F is given by the global sections of F. This assignment gives rise to a functor f_{∗} from the category of sheaves on X to the category of sheaves on Y, which is known as the direct image functor. Similar constructions exist in many other algebraic and geometric contexts, including that of quasi-coherent sheaves and étale sheaves on a scheme.

== Definition ==
Let f: X → Y be a continuous map of topological spaces, and let Sh(–) denote the category of sheaves of abelian groups on a topological space. The direct image functor

$$f_*: \operatorname{Sh}(X) \to \operatorname{Sh}(Y)$$

sends a sheaf F on X to its direct image presheaf f_{∗}F on Y, defined on open subsets U of Y by

$$f_*F(U) := F(f^{-1}(U)).$$

This turns out to be a sheaf on Y, and is called the direct image sheaf or pushforward sheaf of F along f.

Since a morphism of sheaves φ: F → G on X gives rise to a morphism of sheaves f_{∗}(φ): f_{∗}(F) → f_{∗}(G) on Y in an obvious way, we indeed have that f_{∗} is a functor.

=== Example ===
If Y is a point, and f: X → Y the unique continuous map, then Sh(Y) is the category Ab of abelian groups, and the direct image functor f_{∗}: Sh(X) → Ab equals the global sections functor.

=== Variants ===
If dealing with sheaves of sets instead of sheaves of abelian groups, the same definition applies. Similarly, if f: (X, O_{X}) → (Y, O_{Y}) is a morphism of ringed spaces, we obtain a direct image functor f_{∗}: Sh(X,O_{X}) → Sh(Y,O_{Y}) from the category of sheaves of O_{X}-modules to the category of sheaves of O_{Y}-modules. Moreover, if f is now a morphism of quasi-compact and quasi-separated schemes, then f_{∗} preserves the property of being quasi-coherent, so we obtain the direct image functor between categories of quasi-coherent sheaves.

A similar definition applies to sheaves on topoi, such as étale sheaves. There, instead of the above preimage f^{−1}(U), one uses the fiber product of U and X over Y.

== Properties ==
- Forming sheaf categories and direct image functors itself defines a functor from the category of topological spaces to the category of categories: given continuous maps f: X → Y and g: Y → Z, we have (gf)_{∗}=g_{∗}f_{∗}.
- The direct image functor is right adjoint to the inverse image functor, which means that for any continuous $f: X \to Y$ and sheaves $\mathcal F, \mathcal G$ respectively on X, Y, there is a natural isomorphism:

$$\mathrm{Hom}_{\mathbf {Sh}(X)}(f^{-1} \mathcal G, \mathcal F ) = \mathrm{Hom}_{\mathbf {Sh}(Y)}(\mathcal G, f_*\mathcal F)$$.

- If f is the inclusion of a closed subspace X ⊆ Y then f_{∗} is exact. Actually, in this case f_{∗} is an equivalence between the category of sheaves on X and the category of sheaves on Y supported on X. This follows from the fact that the stalk of $(f_* \mathcal F)_y$ is $\mathcal F_y$ if $y \in X$ and zero otherwise (here the closedness of X in Y is used).
- If f is the morphism of affine schemes $\mathrm{Spec} \, S \to \mathrm{Spec} \, R$ determined by a ring homomorphism $\phi: R \to S$, then the direct image functor f_{∗} on quasi-coherent sheaves identifies with the restriction of scalars functor along φ.

== Higher direct images ==
The direct image functor is left exact, but usually not right exact. Hence one can consider the right derived functors of the direct image. They are called higher direct images and denoted R^{q} f_{∗}.

One can show that there is a similar expression as above for higher direct images: for a sheaf F on X, the sheaf R^{q} f_{∗}(F) is the sheaf associated to the presheaf

$$U \mapsto H^q(f^{-1}(U), F)$$,

where H^{q} denotes sheaf cohomology.

In the context of algebraic geometry and a morphism $f: X \to Y$ of quasi-compact and quasi-separated schemes, one likewise has the right derived functor

$$Rf_*: D_{qcoh}(X) \to D_{qcoh}(Y)$$

as a functor between the (unbounded) derived categories of quasi-coherent sheaves. In this situation, $Rf_*$ always admits a right adjoint $f^{\times}$. This is closely related, but not generally equivalent to, the exceptional inverse image functor $f^!$, unless $f$ is also proper.

== See also ==
- Proper base change theorem
