= Mixed Hodge structure =

Algebraic structure

In algebraic geometry, a mixed Hodge structure is an algebraic structure containing information about the cohomology of general algebraic varieties. It is a generalization of a Hodge structure, which is used to study smooth projective varieties.

In mixed Hodge theory, where the decomposition of a cohomology group $H^k(X)$ may have subspaces of different weights, i.e. as a direct sum of Hodge structures

$$H^k(X) = \bigoplus_i (H_i, F_i^\bullet)$$

where each of the Hodge structures have weight $k_i$. One of the early hints that such structures should exist comes from the long exact sequence $\dots \to H^{i-1}(Y) \to H^i_c(U) \to H^i(X) \to \dots$associated to a pair of smooth projective varieties $Y \subset X$. This sequence suggests that the cohomology groups $H^i_c(U)$ (for $U = X - Y$) should have differing weights coming from both $H^{i-1}(Y)$ and $H^i(X)$.

== Motivation ==
Originally, Hodge structures were introduced as a tool for keeping track of abstract Hodge decompositions on the cohomology groups of smooth projective algebraic varieties. These structures gave geometers new tools for studying algebraic curves, such as the Torelli theorem, Abelian varieties, and the cohomology of smooth projective varieties. One of the chief results for computing Hodge structures is an explicit decomposition of the cohomology groups of smooth hypersurfaces using the relation between the Jacobian ideal and the Hodge decomposition of a smooth projective hypersurface through Griffith's residue theorem. Porting this language to smooth non-projective varieties and singular varieties requires the concept of mixed Hodge structures.

== Definition ==
A mixed Hodge structure (MHS) is a triple $(H_\mathbb{Z},W_\bullet, F^\bullet)$ such that

1. $H_\mathbb{Z}$ is a $\mathbb{Z}$-module of finite type
2. $W_\bullet$ is an increasing $\mathbb{Z}$-filtration on $H_\mathbb{Q} = H_\mathbb{Z}\otimes\mathbb{Q}$, $\cdots \subset W_0 \subset W_1 \subset W_2 \subset \cdots$
3. $F^\bullet$ is a decreasing $\mathbb{N}$-filtration on $H_\mathbb{C}$, $H_\mathbb{C} = F^0 \supset F^1 \supset F^2 \supset \cdots$

where the induced filtration of $F^\bullet$ on the graded pieces

$\text{Gr}^{W}_kH_\mathbb{Q} = \frac{W_kH_\mathbb{Q}}{W_{k-1}H_\mathbb{Q}}$

are pure Hodge structures of weight $k$.

=== Remark on filtrations ===
Note that similar to Hodge structures, mixed Hodge structures use a filtration instead of a direct sum decomposition since the cohomology groups with anti-holomorphic terms, $H^{p,q}$ where $q > 0$, don't vary holomorphically. But, the filtrations can vary holomorphically, giving a better defined structure.

=== Morphisms of mixed Hodge structures ===
Morphisms of mixed Hodge structures are defined by maps of abelian groups

$f:(H_\mathbb{Z},W_\bullet, F^\bullet) \to (H_\mathbb{Z}',W_\bullet', F'^\bullet)$

such that

$f(W_l) \subset W'_l$

and the induced map of $\mathbb{C}$-vector spaces has the property

$f_\mathbb{C}(F^p) \subset F'^p$

== Further definitions and properties ==
=== Hodge numbers ===
The Hodge numbers of a MHS are defined as the dimensions

$h^{p,q}(H_\mathbb{Z}) = \dim_\mathbb{C}\text{Gr}_{F^\bullet}^p\text{Gr}_{p+q}^{W_\bullet}H_\mathbb{C}$

since $\text{Gr}_{p+q}^{W_\bullet}H_\mathbb{C}$ is a weight $(p+q)$ Hodge structure, and

$\text{Gr}_p^{F^\bullet} = \frac{F^p}{F^{p+1}}$

is the $(p,q)$-component of a weight $(p+q)$ Hodge structure.

=== Homological properties ===
There is an Abelian category of mixed Hodge structures which has vanishing $\text{Ext}$-groups whenever the cohomological degree is greater than $1$: that is, given mixed hodge structures $(H_\mathbb{Z},W_\bullet, F^\bullet), (H_\mathbb{Z}',W_\bullet', F'^\bullet)$ the groups

$\operatorname{Ext}_{MHS}^p((H_\mathbb{Z},W_\bullet, F^\bullet), (H_\mathbb{Z}',W_\bullet', F'^\bullet)) = 0$

for $p \geq 2$^{pg 83}.

== Mixed Hodge structures on bi-filtered complexes ==
Many mixed Hodge structures can be constructed from a bifiltered complex. This includes complements of smooth varieties defined by the complement of a normal crossing variety. Given a complex of sheaves of abelian groups $A^\bullet$ and filtrations $W_\bullet, F^\bullet$ of the complex, meaning

$$\begin{align}
d(W_iA^\bullet) &\subset W_iA^\bullet \\
d(F^iA^\bullet) &\subset F^iA^\bullet
\end{align}$$

There is an induced mixed Hodge structure on the hyperhomology groups

$(\mathbb{H}^k(X,A^\bullet), W_\bullet, F^\bullet)$

from the bi-filtered complex $(A^\bullet, W_\bullet, F^\bullet)$. Such a bi-filtered complex is called a mixed Hodge complex.

=== Logarithmic complex ===
Given a smooth variety $U \subset X$ where $D = X - U$ is a normal crossing divisor (meaning all intersections of components are complete intersections), there are filtrations on the logarithmic de Rham complex $\Omega_X^\bullet(\log D)$ given by

$$\begin{align}
W_m\Omega^i_X(\log D) &= \begin{cases}
\Omega_X^i(\log D) & \text{ if } i \leq m \\
\Omega_X^{i-m}\wedge \Omega_X^m(\log D) & \text{ if }0 \leq m \leq i \\
0 & \text{ if } m < 0
\end{cases} \\[6pt]
F^p\Omega^i_X(\log D) &= \begin{cases}
\Omega_X^i(\log D) & \text{ if } p \leq i \\
0 & \text{ otherwise}
\end{cases}
\end{align}$$

It turns out these filtrations define a natural mixed Hodge structure on the cohomology group $H^n(U,\mathbb{C})$ from the mixed Hodge complex defined on the logarithmic complex $\Omega_X^\bullet(\log D)$.

==== Smooth compactifications ====
The above construction of the logarithmic complex extends to every smooth variety; and the mixed Hodge structure is isomorphic under any such compactificaiton. Note a smooth compactification of a smooth variety $U$ is defined as a smooth variety $X$ and an embedding $U \hookrightarrow X$ such that $D = X - U$ is a normal crossing divisor. That is, given compactifications $U \subset X, X'$ with boundary divisors $D = X - U, \text{ } D' = X' - U$ there is an isomorphism of mixed Hodge structure

$(\mathbb{H}^k(X,\Omega_X^\bullet(\log D)), W_\bullet, F^\bullet) \cong(\mathbb{H}^k(X',\Omega_{X'}^\bullet(\log D')), W_\bullet, F^\bullet)$

showing the mixed Hodge structure is invariant under smooth compactification.

==== Example ====
For example, on a genus $0$ plane curve $C$ logarithmic cohomology of $C$ with the normal crossing divisor $\{p_1 ,\ldots, p_k\}$ with $k \geq 1$ can be easily computed since the terms of the complex $\Omega_C^\bullet(\log D)$ equal to

$\mathcal{O}_C \xrightarrow{d} \Omega_C^1(\log D)$

are both acyclic. Then, the Hypercohomology is just

$\Gamma(\mathcal{O}_{\mathbb{P}^1}) \xrightarrow{d} \Gamma(\Omega_{\mathbb{P}^1}(\log D))$

the first vector space are just the constant sections, hence the differential is the zero map. The second is the vector space is isomorphic to the vector space spanned by

$\mathbb{C} \cdot \frac{dx}{x - p_1}\oplus \cdots \oplus \mathbb{C} \frac{dx}{x-p_{k-1}}$

Then $\mathbb{H}^1(\Omega_C^1(\log D))$ has a weight $2$ mixed Hodge structure and $\mathbb{H}^0(\Omega_C^1(\log D))$ has a weight $0$ mixed Hodge structure.

== Examples ==
=== Complement of a smooth projective curve by two points ===
We give here the simplest example which isolates the phenomenon at hand. We will explain the MHS on (a twist of) $H^1(U,\mathbb{Z})$ where $U$ is the complement of a smooth projective curve by two points.

Let $X$ be a smooth proper (hence projective) curve over $\mathbb{C}$ and let $Z:=\{x,y\}$ be two points in $X$. We get a so called recollement situation

$i:Z\hookrightarrow X \hookleftarrow U:j$

where $U:=X-Z$.

One has an exact triangle of constructible sheaves on $X$

$i_*i^!\mathbb{Z}_X\to \mathbb{Z}_X\to Rj_*j^*\mathbb{Z}_X\xrightarrow{+}$

The purity isomorphism (coming from Verdier duality) identifies $i^!\mathbb{Z}_X=i^*\mathbb{Z}_X[-2](-1)$, whence the relevant terms of the exact triangle upon taking cohomology give us the exact sequence of MHS

$0\to H^1(X,\mathbb{Z})\to H^1(U,\mathbb{Z})\to H^0(Z,\mathbb{Z})(-1)\to H^2(X,\mathbb{Z})\to 0$

Rationalizing, and noting that $H^2(X,\mathbb{Q})=\mathbb{Q}(-1)$, we get a sequence of rational MHS

$0\to H^1(X,\mathbb{Q})(1)\to H^1(U,\mathbb{Q})(1)\to \mathbb{Q} \to 0$

We may now read off the weight filtration on $H^1(U,\mathbb{Q})(1)$ as follows: in filtered degree $-2$ we have $W_{-2}H^1(U,\mathbb{Q})(1)=0$, in filtered degree $-1$ we have $W_{-1}H^1(U,\mathbb{Q})(1)=H^1(X,\mathbb{Q})(1)$ and in filtered degree $0$ we have $W_0H^1(U,\mathbb{Q})(1)=H^1(U,\mathbb{Q})(1)$.

It remains to check that the graded pieces have the correct weights. But it is immediate from the exact sequence of rational MHS above that $\mathrm{Gr}_i^W(H^1(U,\mathbb{Q})(1))$ is pure of weight $i$ for $i\in \{-1,0\}$. Note that if the genus of the curve $X$ is greater than $0$, then indeed the graded for $i=-1$ is non-zero.

=== Complement of a smooth projective variety by a closed subvariety ===
Given a smooth projective variety $X$ of dimension $n$ and a closed subvariety $Y \subset X$ there is a long exact sequence in cohomology^{pg7-8}

$\cdots \to H^m_c(U;\mathbb{Z}) \to H^m(X;\mathbb{Z}) \to H^m(Y;\mathbb{Z}) \to H^{m+1}_c(U;\mathbb{Z}) \to \cdots$

coming from the distinguished triangle

$\mathbf{R}j_!\mathbb{Z}_U \to \mathbb{Z}_X \to i_*\mathbb{Z}_Y \xrightarrow{[+1]}$

of constructible sheaves. There is another long exact sequence

$\cdots \to H^{BM}_{2n-m}(Y;\mathbb{Z})(-n) \to H^m(X;\mathbb{Z}) \to H^m(U;\mathbb{Z}) \to H^{BM}_{2n-m-1}(Y;\mathbb{Z})(-n) \to \cdots$

from the distinguished triangle

$i_*i^!\mathbb{Z}_X \to \mathbb{Z}_X \to \mathbf{R}j_*\mathbb{Z}_U \xrightarrow{[+1]}$

whenever $X$ is smooth. Note the homology groups $H^{BM}_k(X)$ are called Borel–Moore homology, which are dual to cohomology for general spaces and the $(n)$ means tensoring with the Tate structure $\mathbb{Z}(1)^{\otimes n}$ add weight $-2n$ to the weight filtration. The smoothness hypothesis is required because Verdier duality implies $i^!D_X = D_Y$, and $D_X \cong \mathbb{Z}_X[2n]$ whenever $X$ is smooth. Also, the dualizing complex for $X$ has weight $n$, hence $D_X \cong \mathbb{Z}_X[2n](n)$. Also, the maps from Borel-Moore homology must be twisted by up to weight $(n)$ is order for it to have a map to $H^m(X)$. Also, there is the perfect duality pairing

$H^{BM}_{2n-m}(Y)\times H^m(Y) \to \mathbb{Z}$

giving an isomorphism of the two groups.

=== Algebraic torus ===
A one dimensional algebraic torus $\mathbb{T}$ is isomorphic to the variety $\mathbb{P}^1-\{0,\infty \}$, hence its cohomology groups are isomorphic to

$$\begin{align}
H^0(\mathbb{T})\oplus H^1(\mathbb{T}) & \cong \mathbb{Z} \oplus \mathbb{Z}
\end{align}$$

The long exact exact sequence then reads

$$\begin{matrix}
&H_2^{BM}(Y)(-1) \to H^0(\mathbb{P}^1) \to H^0(\mathbb{G}_m) \to  \text{ } \\
&H_1^{BM}(Y)(-1) \to H^1(\mathbb{P}^1) \to H^1(\mathbb{G}_m) \to  \text{ }  \\
&H_0^{BM}(Y)(-1) \to H^2(\mathbb{P}^1) \to H^2(\mathbb{G}_m) \to 0
\end{matrix}$$

Since $H^1(\mathbb{P}^1) = 0$ and $H^2(\mathbb{G}_m) = 0$ this gives the exact sequence

$0 \to H^1(\mathbb{G}_m) \to H_0^{BM}(Y)(-1) \to H^2(\mathbb{P}^1) \to 0$

since there is a twisting of weights for well-defined maps of mixed Hodge structures, there is the isomorphism

$H^1(\mathbb{G}_m) \cong \mathbb{Z}(-1)$

=== Quartic K3 surface minus a genus 3 curve ===
Given a quartic K3 surface $X$, and a genus 3 curve $i:C \hookrightarrow X$ defined by the vanishing locus of a generic section of $\mathcal{O}_X(1)$, hence it is isomorphic to a degree $4$ plane curve, which has genus 3. Then, the Gysin sequence gives the long exact sequence

$\to H^{k-2}(C) \xrightarrow{\gamma_k} H^k(X) \xrightarrow{i^*} H^k(U) \xrightarrow{R} H^{k-1}(C) \to$

But, it is a result that the maps $\gamma_k$ take a Hodge class of type $(p,q)$ to a Hodge class of type $(p+1,q+1)$. The Hodge structures for both the K3 surface and the curve are well-known, and can be computed using the Jacobian ideal. In the case of the curve there are two zero maps

$\gamma_3:H^{1,0}(C) \to H^{2,1}(X) = 0$ $\gamma_3:H^{0,1}(C) \to H^{1,2}(X) = 0$

hence $H^2(U)$ contains the weight one pieces $H^{1,0}(C) \oplus H^{0,1}(C)$. Because $H^2(X) = H^2_\text{prim}(X)\oplus \mathbb{C}\cdot \mathbb{L}$ has dimension $22$, but the Leftschetz class $\mathbb{L}$ is killed off by the map

$\gamma_2:H^0(C) \to H^2(X)$

sending the $(0,0)$ class in $H^0(C)$ to the $(1,1)$ class in $H^2(X)$. Then the primitive cohomology group $H^2_\text{prim}(X)$ is the weight 2 piece of $H^2(U)$. Therefore,

$$\begin{align}
\text{Gr}_2^{W_\bullet}H^2(U) &= H^2_\text{prim}(X)\\
\text{Gr}_1^{W_\bullet}H^2(U) &= H^1(C) \\
\text{Gr}_k^{W_\bullet}H^2(U) &= 0 & k \neq 1,2
\end{align}$$

The induced filtrations on these graded pieces are the Hodge filtrations coming from each cohomology group.

== See also ==
- Motive (algebraic geometry)
- Jacobian ideal
- Milnor fiber
- Mixed Hodge module
