= Period domain =

In mathematics, a period domain is a parameter space for a polarized Hodge structure. They can often be represented as the quotient of a Lie group by a compact subgroup.

== See also ==
- Period mapping
