= Hodge structure =

Algebraic structure

In mathematics, a Hodge structure, named after W. V. D. Hodge, is an algebraic structure at the level of linear algebra, similar to the one that Hodge theory gives to the cohomology groups of a smooth and compact Kähler manifold. Hodge structures have been generalized for all complex varieties (even if they are singular and non-complete) in the form of mixed Hodge structures, defined by Pierre Deligne (1970). A variation of Hodge structure is a family of Hodge structures parameterized by a manifold, first studied by Phillip Griffiths (1968). All these concepts were further generalized to mixed Hodge modules over complex varieties by Morihiko Saito (1989).

== Hodge structures ==
=== Definition of Hodge structures ===
A pure Hodge structure of integer weight n consists of an abelian group $H_{\Z}$ and a decomposition of its complexification $H$ into a direct sum of complex subspaces $H^{p,q}$, where $p+q=n$, with the property that the complex conjugate of $H^{p,q}$ is $H^{q,p}$:

$$H := H_{\Z}\otimes_{\Z} \Complex = \bigoplus\nolimits_{p+q=n}H^{p,q},$$
$$\overline{H^{p,q}}=H^{q,p}.$$

An equivalent definition is obtained by replacing the direct sum decomposition of $H$ by the Hodge filtration, a finite decreasing filtration of $H$ by complex subspaces $F^pH (p \in \Z),$ subject to the condition

$$\forall p, q \ : \ p + q = n+1, \qquad F^p H\cap\overline{F^q H}=0 \quad \text{and} \quad F^p H \oplus \overline{F^q H}=H.$$

The relation between these two descriptions is given as follows:

$$H^{p,q}=F^p H\cap \overline{F^q H},$$
$$F^p H= \bigoplus\nolimits_{i\geq p} H^{i,n-i}.$$

For example, if $X$ is a compact Kähler manifold, $H_{\Z} = H^n (X, \Z)$ is the $n$-th cohomology group of X with integer coefficients, then $H = H^n (X, \Complex)$ is its $n$-th cohomology group with complex coefficients and Hodge theory provides the decomposition of $H$ into a direct sum as above, so that these data define a pure Hodge structure of weight $n$. On the other hand, the Hodge–de Rham spectral sequence supplies $H^n$ with the decreasing filtration by $F^p H$ as in the second definition.

For applications in algebraic geometry, namely, classification of complex projective varieties by their periods, the set of all Hodge structures of weight $n$ on $H_{\Z}$ is too big. Using the Riemann bilinear relations, in this case called Hodge Riemann bilinear relations, it can be substantially simplified. A polarized Hodge structure of weight n consists of a Hodge structure $(H_{\Z}, H^{p,q})$ and a non-degenerate integer bilinear form $Q$ on $H_{\Z}$ (polarization), which is extended to $H$ by linearity, and satisfying the conditions:

$$\begin{align}
Q(\varphi,\psi) &= (-1)^n Q(\psi, \varphi) &&\text{ for }\varphi\in H^{p,q}, \psi\in H^{p',q'}; \\
Q(\varphi,\psi) &=0 && \text{ for }\varphi\in H^{p,q}, \psi\in H^{p',q'}, p\ne q'; \\
i^{p-q}Q \left(\varphi,\bar{\varphi} \right) &>0 && \text{ for }\varphi\in H^{p,q},\ \varphi\ne 0.
\end{align}$$

In terms of the Hodge filtration, these conditions imply that

$$\begin{align}
Q \left (F^p, F^{n-p+1} \right ) &=0, \\
Q \left (C\varphi,\bar{\varphi} \right ) &>0 && \text{ for }\varphi\ne 0,
\end{align}$$

where $C$ is the Weil operator on $H$, given by $C = i^{p-q}$ on $H^{p,q}$.

Yet another definition of a Hodge structure is based on the equivalence between the $\Z$-grading on a complex vector space and the action of the circle group U(1). In this definition, an action of the multiplicative group of complex numbers $\Complex^*$ viewed as a two-dimensional real algebraic torus, is given on $H$. This action must have the property that a real number a acts by a^{n}. The subspace $H^{p,q}$ is the subspace on which $z \in \Complex^*$ acts as multiplication by $z^{\,p}{\bar{z}}^{\,q}.$

=== A-Hodge structure ===
In the theory of motives, it becomes important to allow more general coefficients for the cohomology. The definition of a Hodge structure is modified by fixing a Noetherian subring A of the field $\R$ of real numbers, for which $\mathbf{A} \otimes_{\Z} \R$ is a field. Then a pure Hodge A-structure of weight n is defined as before, replacing $\Z$ with A. There are natural functors of base change and restriction relating Hodge A-structures and B-structures for A a subring of B.

== Mixed Hodge structures ==
It was noticed by Jean-Pierre Serre in the 1960s based on the Weil conjectures that even singular (possibly reducible) and non-complete algebraic varieties should admit 'virtual Betti numbers'. More precisely, one should be able to assign to any algebraic variety X a polynomial P_{X}(t), called its virtual Poincaré polynomial, with the properties

- If X is nonsingular and projective (or complete)
  $$P_X(t) = \sum \operatorname{rank}(H^n(X))t^n$$
- If Y is closed algebraic subset of X and U = X \ Y
  $$P_X(t)=P_Y(t)+P_U(t)$$

The existence of such polynomials would follow from the existence of an analogue of Hodge structure in the cohomologies of a general (singular and non-complete) algebraic variety. The novel feature is that the nth cohomology of a general variety looks as if it contained pieces of different weights. This led Alexander Grothendieck to his conjectural theory of motives and motivated a search for an extension of Hodge theory, which culminated in the work of Pierre Deligne. He introduced the notion of a mixed Hodge structure, developed techniques for working with them, gave their construction (based on Heisuke Hironaka's resolution of singularities) and related them to the weights on l-adic cohomology, proving the last part of the Weil conjectures.

=== Example of curves ===
To motivate the definition, consider the case of a reducible complex algebraic curve X consisting of two nonsingular components, $X_1$ and $X_2$, which transversally intersect at the points $Q_1$ and $Q_2$. Further, assume that the components are not compact, but can be compactified by adding the points $P_1, \dots ,P_n$. The first cohomology group of the curve X (with compact support) is dual to the first homology group, which is easier to visualize. There are three types of one-cycles in this group. First, there are elements $\alpha_i$ representing small loops around the punctures $P_i$. Then there are elements $\beta_j$ that are coming from the first homology of the compactification of each of the components. The one-cycle in $X_k \subset X$ ($k=1,2$) corresponding to a cycle in the compactification of this component, is not canonical: these elements are determined modulo the span of $\alpha_1, \dots ,\alpha_n$. Finally, modulo the first two types, the group is generated by a combinatorial cycle $\gamma$ which goes from $Q_1$ to $Q_2$along a path in one component $X_1$ and comes back along a path in the other component $X_2$. This suggests that $H_1(X)$ admits an increasing filtration

$$0\subset W_0\subset W_1 \subset W_2=H^1(X),$$

whose successive quotients W_{n}/W_{n−1} originate from the cohomology of smooth complete varieties, hence admit (pure) Hodge structures, albeit of different weights. Further examples can be found in "A Naive Guide to Mixed Hodge Theory".

=== Definition of mixed Hodge structure ===
A mixed Hodge structure on an abelian group $H_{\Z}$ consists of a finite decreasing filtration F^{p} on the complex vector space H (the complexification of $H_{\Z}$), called the Hodge filtration and a finite increasing filtration W_{i} on the rational vector space $H_{\Q} = H_{\Z} \otimes_{\Z} \Q$ (obtained by extending the scalars to rational numbers), called the weight filtration, subject to the requirement that the n-th associated graded quotient of $H_{\Q}$ with respect to the weight filtration, together with the filtration induced by F on its complexification, is a pure Hodge structure of weight n, for all integer n. Here the induced filtration on

$$\operatorname{gr}_n^{W} H = W_n\otimes\Complex /W_{n-1}\otimes\Complex$$

is defined by

$$F^p \operatorname{gr}_n^W H = \left (F^p\cap W_n\otimes\Complex +W_{n-1} \otimes \Complex \right )/W_{n-1}\otimes\Complex.$$

One can define a notion of a morphism of mixed Hodge structures, which has to be compatible with the filtrations F and W and prove the following:

Theorem. Mixed Hodge structures form an abelian category. The kernels and cokernels in this category coincide with the usual kernels and cokernels in the category of vector spaces, with the induced filtrations.

The total cohomology of a compact Kähler manifold has a mixed Hodge structure, where the nth space of the weight filtration W_{n} is the direct sum of the cohomology groups (with rational coefficients) of degree less than or equal to n. Therefore, one can think of classical Hodge theory in the compact, complex case as providing a double grading on the complex cohomology group, which defines a decreasing filtration F^{p} and an increasing filtration W_{n} that are compatible in certain way. In general, the total cohomology space still has these two filtrations, but they no longer come from a direct sum decomposition. In relation with the third definition of the pure Hodge structure, one can say that a mixed Hodge structure cannot be described using the action of the group $\Complex^*.$ An important insight of Deligne is that in the mixed case there is a more complicated noncommutative proalgebraic group that can be used to the same effect using Tannakian formalism.

Moreover, the category of (mixed) Hodge structures admits a good notion of tensor product, corresponding to the product of varieties, as well as related concepts of inner Hom and dual object, making it into a Tannakian category. By Tannaka–Krein philosophy, this category is equivalent to the category of finite-dimensional representations of a certain group, which Deligne, Milne and et el. has explicitly described, see Deligne & Milne (1982) and Deligne (1994). The description of this group was recast in more geometrical terms by Kapranov (2012). The corresponding (much more involved) analysis for rational pure polarizable Hodge structures was done by Patrikis (2016).

=== Mixed Hodge structure in cohomology (Deligne's theorem) ===
Deligne has proved that the nth cohomology group of an arbitrary algebraic variety has a canonical mixed Hodge structure. This structure is functorial, and compatible with the products of varieties (Künneth isomorphism) and the product in cohomology. For a complete nonsingular variety X this structure is pure of weight n, and the Hodge filtration can be defined through the hypercohomology of the truncated de Rham complex.

The proof roughly consists of two parts, taking care of noncompactness and singularities. Both parts use the resolution of singularities (due to Hironaka) in an essential way. In the singular case, varieties are replaced by simplicial schemes, leading to more complicated homological algebra, and a technical notion of a Hodge structure on complexes (as opposed to cohomology) is used.

Using the theory of motives, it is possible to refine the weight filtration on the cohomology with rational coefficients to one with integral coefficients.

== Examples ==
- The Tate–Hodge structure $\Z(1)$ is the Hodge structure with underlying $\Z$ module given by $2\pi i\Z$ (a subgroup of $\Complex$), with $\Z(1) \otimes \Complex = H^{-1,-1}.$ So it is pure of weight −2 by definition and it is the unique 1-dimensional pure Hodge structure of weight −2 up to isomorphisms. More generally, its nth tensor power is denoted by $\Z(n);$ it is 1-dimensional and pure of weight −2n.
- The cohomology of a compact Kähler manifold has a Hodge structure, and the nth cohomology group is pure of weight n.
- The cohomology of a complex variety (possibly singular or non-proper) has a mixed Hodge structure. This was shown for smooth varieties by Deligne (1971), Deligne (1971a) and in general by Deligne (1974).
- For a projective variety $X$ with normal crossing singularities there is a spectral sequence with a degenerate E_{2}-page which computes all of its mixed Hodge structures. The E_{1}-page has explicit terms with a differential coming from a simplicial set.
- Any smooth variety X admits a smooth compactification with complement a normal crossing divisor. The corresponding logarithmic forms can be used to describe the mixed Hodge structure on the cohomology of X explicitly.
- The Hodge structure for a smooth projective hypersurface $X\subset \mathbb{P}^{n+1}$ of degree $d$ was worked out explicitly by Griffiths in his "Period Integrals of Algebraic Manifolds" paper. If $f\in \Complex [x_0,\ldots,x_{n+1}]$ is the polynomial defining the hypersurface $X$ then the graded Jacobian quotient ring
  $$R(f) = \frac{\Complex[x_0,\ldots,x_{n+1}]}{\left( \frac{\partial f}{\partial x_0}, \ldots, \frac{\partial f}{\partial x_{n+1}}\right)}$$
  contains all of the information of the middle cohomology of $X$. He shows that
  $$H^{p,n-p}(X)_\text{prim} \cong R(f)_{(n+1-p)d - n -2}$$
  For example, consider the K3 surface given by $g = x_0^4 + \cdots + x_3^4$, hence $d = 4$ and $n = 2$. Then, the graded Jacobian ring is
  $$\frac{\Complex [x_0,x_1,x_2,x_3]}{(x_0^3,x_1^3,x_2^3,x_3^3)}$$
  The isomorphism for the primitive cohomology groups then read
  $$H^{p,n-p}(X)_{prim} \cong R(g)_{(2+1 - p)4 - 2 - 2} = R(g)_{4(3-p) - 4}$$
  hence
  $$\begin{align}
H^{0,2}(X)_\text{prim} &\cong R(g)_8 = \Complex \cdot x_0^2x_1^2x_2^2x_3^2 \\
H^{1,1}(X)_\text{prim} &\cong R(g)_4\\
H^{2,0}(X)_\text{prim} &\cong R(g)_0 = \Complex \cdot 1
\end{align}$$
  Notice that $R(g)_4$ is the vector space spanned by
  $$\begin{array}{rrrrrrrr}
x_0^2 x_1^2, & x_0^2 x_1 x_2, & x_0^2x_1x_3, & x_0^2x_2^2, & x_0^2x_2x_3, & x_0^2x_3^2, & x_0x_1^2x_2, & x_0x_1^2x_3, \\
x_0 x_1 x_2^2, & x_0 x_1 x_2 x_3, & x_0x_1x_3^2, & x_0x_2^2x_3, & x_0x_2x_3^2, & x_1^2x_2^2, & x_1^2x_2x_3, & x_1^2x_3^2, \\
x_1 x_2^2 x_3, & x_1 x_2 x_3^2, & x_2^2x_3^2
\end{array}$$
  which is 19-dimensional. There is an extra vector in $H^{1,1}(X)$ given by the Lefschetz class $[L]$. From the Lefschetz hyperplane theorem and Hodge duality, the rest of the cohomology is in $H^{k,k}(X)$ as is $1$-dimensional. Hence the Hodge diamond reads
  		1
  	0		0
  1		20		1
  	0		0
  		1
- We can also use the previous isomorphism to verify the genus of a degree $d$ plane curve. Since $x^d + y^d + z^d$ is a smooth curve and the Ehresmann fibration theorem guarantees that every other smooth curve of genus $g$ is diffeomorphic, we have that the genus then the same. So, using the isomorphism of primitive cohomology with the graded part of the Jacobian ring, we see that
  $$H^{1,0} \cong R(f)_{d-3} \cong \Complex [x,y,z]_{d-3}$$
  This implies that the dimension is
  $${2 + d - 3 \choose 2} = {d-1 \choose 2} = \frac{(d-1)(d-2)}{2}$$
  as desired.
- The Hodge numbers for a complete intersection are also readily computable: there is a combinatorial formula found by Friedrich Hirzebruch.

== Applications ==
The machinery based on the notions of Hodge structure and mixed Hodge structure forms a part of still largely conjectural theory of motives envisaged by Alexander Grothendieck. Arithmetic information for nonsingular algebraic variety X, encoded by eigenvalue of Frobenius elements acting on its l-adic cohomology, has something in common with the Hodge structure arising from X considered as a complex algebraic variety. Sergei Gelfand and Yuri Manin remarked around 1988 in their Methods of homological algebra, that unlike Galois symmetries acting on other cohomology groups, the origin of "Hodge symmetries" is very mysterious, although formally, they are expressed through the action of the fairly uncomplicated group $R_{\mathbf {C/R}}{\mathbf C}^*$ on the de Rham cohomology. Since then, the mystery has deepened with the discovery and mathematical formulation of mirror symmetry.

== Variation of Hodge structure ==
A variation of Hodge structure (Griffiths (1968), Griffiths (1968a), Griffiths (1970)) is a family of Hodge structures parameterized by a complex manifold X. More precisely a variation of Hodge structure of weight n on a complex manifold X consists of a locally constant sheaf S of finitely generated abelian groups on X, together with a decreasing Hodge filtration F on S ⊗ O_{X}, subject to the following two conditions:

- The filtration induces a Hodge structure of weight n on each stalk of the sheaf S
- (Griffiths transversality) The natural connection on S ⊗ O_{X} maps $F^n$ into $F^{n-1} \otimes \Omega^1_X.$

Here the natural (flat) connection on S ⊗ O_{X} induced by the flat connection on S and the flat connection d on O_{X}, and O_{X} is the sheaf of holomorphic functions on X, and $\Omega^1_X$ is the sheaf of 1-forms on X. This natural flat connection is a Gauss–Manin connection ∇ and can be described by the Picard–Fuchs equation.

A variation of mixed Hodge structure can be defined in a similar way, by adding a grading or filtration W to S. Typical examples can be found from algebraic morphisms $f:\Complex ^n \to \Complex$. For example,

$$\begin{cases}
f:\Complex ^2 \to \Complex \\
f(x,y) = y^6 - x^6
\end{cases}$$

has fibers

$$X_t = f^{-1}(\{t\}) = \left \{(x,y)\in\Complex ^2: y^6 - x^6 = t \right \}$$

which are smooth plane curves of genus 10 for $t\neq 0$ and degenerate to a singular curve at $t=0.$ Then, the cohomology sheaves

$$\R f_*^i \left( \underline{\Q}_{\Complex ^2} \right)$$

give variations of mixed hodge structures.

== Hodge modules ==
Hodge modules are a generalization of variation of Hodge structures on a complex manifold. They can be thought of informally as something like sheaves of Hodge structures on a manifold; the precise definition Saito (1989) is rather technical and complicated. There are generalizations to mixed Hodge modules, and to manifolds with singularities.

For each smooth complex variety, there is an abelian category of mixed Hodge modules associated with it. These behave formally like the categories of sheaves over the manifolds; for example, morphisms f between manifolds induce functors f_{∗}, f*, f_{!}, f^{!} between (derived categories of) mixed Hodge modules similar to the ones for sheaves.

== See also ==
- Mixed Hodge structure
- Hodge conjecture
- Jacobian ideal
- Hodge–Tate structure

== Introductory references ==
- Debarre, Olivier, Periods and Moduli (PDF).
- Arapura, Donu, Complex Algebraic Varieties and their Cohomology (PDF), pp. 120–123, archived from the original (PDF) on 2020-01-04 (Gives tools for computing hodge numbers using sheaf cohomology.)
- A Naive Guide to Mixed Hodge Theory
- Dimca, Alexandru (1992). Singularities and Topology of Hypersurfaces. Universitext. New York: Springer-Verlag. pp. 240, 261. doi:10.1007/978-1-4612-4404-2. ISBN 0-387-97709-0. MR 1194180. S2CID 117095021. (Gives a formula and generators for mixed Hodge numbers of affine Milnor fiber of a weighted homogenous polynomial, and also a formula for complements of weighted homogeneous polynomials in a weighted projective space.)

== Survey articles ==
- Arapura, Donu (2006), Mixed Hodge Structures Associated to Geometric Variations (PDF), arXiv:math/0611837, Bibcode:2006math.....11837A
