= Polar homology =

In complex geometry, a polar homology is a group which captures holomorphic invariants of a complex manifold in a similar way to usual homology of a manifold in differential topology. Polar homology was defined by B. Khesin and A. Rosly in 1999.

== Definition ==
Let M be a complex projective manifold. The space $C_k$ of polar k-chains is a vector space over ${\mathbb C}$ defined as a quotient $A_k/R_k$, with $A_k$ and $R_k$ vector spaces defined below.

=== Defining A_{k} ===
The space $A_k$ is freely generated by the triples $(X, f, \alpha)$, where X is a smooth, k-dimensional complex manifold, $f:\; X \mapsto M$ a holomorphic map, and $\alpha$ is a rational k-form on X, with first order poles on a divisor with normal crossing.

=== Defining R_{k} ===
The space $R_k$ is generated by the following relations.

1. $\lambda (X, f, \alpha)=(X, f, \lambda\alpha)$
2. $(X,f,\alpha)=0$ if $\dim f(X) < k$.
3. $\ \sum_i(X_i,f_i,\alpha_i)=0$ provided that

$$\sum_if_{i*}\alpha_i\equiv 0,$$

where

$dim \;f_i(X_i)=k$ for all $i$ and the push-forwards $f_{i*}\alpha_i$ are considered on the smooth part of $\cup_i f_i(X_i)$.

=== Defining the boundary operator ===
The boundary operator $\partial:\; C_k \mapsto C_{k-1}$ is defined by

$$\partial(X,f,\alpha)=2\pi \sqrt{-1}\sum_i(V_i, f_i, res_{V_i}\,\alpha)$$,

where $V_i$ are components of the polar divisor of $\alpha$, res is the Poincaré residue, and $f_i=f|_{V_i}$ are restrictions of the map f to each component of the divisor.

Khesin and Rosly proved that this boundary operator is well defined, and satisfies $\partial^2=0$. They defined the polar cohomology as the quotient $\operatorname{ker}\; \partial / \operatorname{im} \; \partial$.

== Notes ==
- B. Khesin, A. Rosly, Polar Homology and Holomorphic Bundles Phil. Trans. Roy. Soc. Lond. A359 (2001) 1413-1428
