= Logarithmic form =

Meromorphic differential form

In algebraic geometry and the theory of complex manifolds, a logarithmic differential form is a differential form with poles of a certain kind. The concept was introduced by Pierre Deligne. In short, logarithmic differentials have the mildest possible singularities needed in order to give information about an open submanifold (the complement of the divisor of poles). (This idea is made precise by several versions of de Rham's theorem discussed below.)

Let X be a complex manifold, D ⊂ X a reduced divisor (a sum of distinct codimension-1 complex subspaces), and ω a holomorphic p-form on X−D. If both ω and dω have a pole of order at most 1 along D, then ω is said to have a logarithmic pole along D. ω is also known as a logarithmic p-form. The p-forms with log poles along D form a subsheaf of the meromorphic p-forms on X, denoted

$$\Omega^p_X(\log D).$$

The name comes from the fact that in complex analysis, $d(\log z)=dz/z$; here $dz/z$ is a typical example of a 1-form on the complex numbers C with a logarithmic pole at the origin. Differential forms such as $dz/z$ make sense in a purely algebraic context, where there is no analog of the logarithm function.

== Logarithmic de Rham complex ==
Let X be a complex manifold and D a reduced divisor on X. By definition of $\Omega^p_X(\log D)$ and the fact that the exterior derivative d satisfies d^{2} = 0, one has

$$d\Omega^p_X(\log D)(U)\subset \Omega^{p+1}_X(\log D)(U)$$

for every open subset U of X. Thus the logarithmic differentials form a complex of sheaves $( \Omega^{\bullet}_X(\log D), d)$, known as the logarithmic de Rham complex associated to the divisor D. This is a subcomplex of the direct image $j_*(\Omega^{\bullet}_{X-D})$, where $j:X-D\rightarrow X$ is the inclusion and $\Omega^{\bullet}_{X-D}$ is the complex of sheaves of holomorphic forms on X−D.

Of special interest is the case where D has normal crossings: that is, D is locally a sum of codimension-1 complex submanifolds that intersect transversely. In this case, the sheaf of logarithmic differential forms is the subalgebra of $j_*(\Omega^{\bullet}_{X-D})$ generated by the holomorphic differential forms $\Omega^{\bullet}_X$ together with the 1-forms $df/f$ for holomorphic functions $f$ that are nonzero outside D. Note that

$$\frac{d(fg)}{fg}=\frac{df}{f}+\frac{dg}{g}.$$

Concretely, if D is a divisor with normal crossings on a complex manifold X, then each point x has an open neighborhood U on which there are holomorphic coordinate functions $z_1,\ldots,z_n$ such that x is the origin and D is defined by the equation $z_1\cdots z_k = 0$ for some $0\leq k\leq n$. On the open set U, sections of $\Omega^1_X(\log D)$ are given by

$$\Omega_X^1(\log D) = \mathcal{O}_{X}\frac{dz_1}{z_1}\oplus\cdots\oplus\mathcal{O}_{X}\frac{dz_k}{z_k} \oplus \mathcal{O}_{X}dz_{k+1} \oplus \cdots \oplus \mathcal{O}_{X}dz_n.$$

This describes the holomorphic vector bundle $\Omega_X^1(\log D)$ on $X$. Then, for any $k\geq 0$, the vector bundle $\Omega^k_X(\log D)$ is the kth exterior power,

$$\Omega_X^k(\log D) = \bigwedge^k \Omega_X^1(\log D).$$

The logarithmic tangent bundle $TX(-\log D)$ means the dual vector bundle to $\Omega^1_X(\log D)$. Explicitly, a section of $TX(-\log D)$ is a holomorphic vector field on X that is tangent to D at all smooth points of D.

=== Logarithmic differentials and singular cohomology ===
Let X be a complex manifold and D a divisor with normal crossings on X. Deligne proved a holomorphic analog of de Rham's theorem in terms of logarithmic differentials. Namely,

$$H^k(X, \Omega^{\bullet}_X(\log D))\cong H^k(X-D,\mathbf{C}),$$

where the left side denotes the cohomology of X with coefficients in a complex of sheaves, sometimes called hypercohomology. This follows from the natural inclusion of complexes of sheaves

$$\Omega^{\bullet}_X(\log D)\rightarrow j_*\Omega_{X-D}^{\bullet}$$

being a quasi-isomorphism.

== Logarithmic differentials in algebraic geometry ==
In algebraic geometry, the vector bundle of logarithmic differential p-forms $\Omega^p_X(\log D)$ on a smooth scheme X over a field, with respect to a divisor $D = \sum D_j$ with simple normal crossings, is defined as above: sections of $\Omega^p_X(\log D)$ are (algebraic) differential forms ω on $X-D$ such that both ω and dω have a pole of order at most one along D. Explicitly, for a closed point x that lies in $D_j$ for $1 \le j \le k$ and not in $D_j$ for $j > k$, let $u_j$ be regular functions on some open neighborhood U of x such that $D_j$ is the closed subscheme defined by $u_j=0$ inside U for $1 \le j \le k$, and x is the closed subscheme of U defined by $u_1=\cdots=u_n=0$. Then a basis of sections of $\Omega^1_X(\log D)$ on U is given by:

$${du_1 \over u_1}, \dots, {du_k \over u_k}, \, du_{k+1}, \dots, du_n.$$

This describes the vector bundle $\Omega^1_X(\log D)$ on X, and then $\Omega^p_X(\log D)$ is the pth exterior power of $\Omega^1_X(\log D)$.

There is an exact sequence of coherent sheaves on X:

$$0 \to \Omega^1_X \to \Omega^1_X(\log D) \overset{\beta}\to \oplus_j ({i_j})_*\mathcal{O}_{D_j} \to 0,$$

where $i_j: D_j \to X$ is the inclusion of an irreducible component of D. Here β is called the residue map; so this sequence says that a 1-form with log poles along D is regular (that is, has no poles) if and only if its residues are zero. More generally, for any p ≥ 0, there is an exact sequence of coherent sheaves on X:

$$0 \to \Omega^p_X \to \Omega^p_X(\log D) \overset{\beta}\to \oplus_j ({i_j})_*\Omega^{p-1}_{D_j}(\log (D-D_j)) \to \cdots \to 0,$$

where the sums run over all irreducible components of given dimension of intersections of the divisors D_{j}. Here again, β is called the residue map.

Explicitly, on an open subset of $X$ that only meets one component $D_j$ of $D$, with $D_j$ locally defined by $f=0$, the residue of a logarithmic $p$-form along $D_j$ is determined by: the residue of a regular p-form is zero, whereas

$$\text{Res}_{D_j}\bigg(\frac{df}{f}\wedge \alpha\bigg)=\alpha|_{D_j}$$

for any regular $(p-1)$-form $\alpha$. Some authors define the residue by saying that $\alpha\wedge(df/f)$ has residue $\alpha|_{D_j}$, which differs from the definition here by the sign $(-1)^{p-1}$.

=== Example of the residue ===
Over the complex numbers, the residue of a differential form with log poles along a divisor $D_j$ can be viewed as the result of integration over loops in $X$ around $D_j$. In this context, the residue may be called the Poincaré residue.

For an explicit example, consider an elliptic curve D in the complex projective plane $\mathbf{P}^2=\{ [x,y,z]\}$, defined in affine coordinates $z=1$ by the equation $g(x,y) = y^2 - f(x) = 0,$ where $f(x) = x(x-1)(x-\lambda)$ and $\lambda\neq 0,1$ is a complex number. Then D is a smooth hypersurface of degree 3 in $\mathbf{P}^2$ and, in particular, a divisor with simple normal crossings. There is a meromorphic 2-form on $\mathbf{P}^2$ given in affine coordinates by

$$\omega =\frac{dx\wedge dy}{g(x,y)},$$

which has log poles along D. Because the canonical bundle $K_{\mathbf{P}^2}=\Omega^2_{\mathbf{P}^2}$ is isomorphic to the line bundle $\mathcal{O}(-3)$, the divisor of poles of $\omega$ must have degree 3. So the divisor of poles of $\omega$ consists only of D (in particular, $\omega$ does not have a pole along the line $z=0$ at infinity). The residue of ω along D is given by the holomorphic 1-form

$$\text{Res}_D(\omega) = \left. \frac{dy}{\partial g/\partial x} \right |_D =\left. -\frac{dx}{\partial g/\partial y} \right |_D = \left. -\frac{1}{2}\frac{dx}{y} \right |_D.$$

It follows that $dx/y|_D$ extends to a holomorphic one-form on the projective curve D in $\mathbf{P}^2$, an elliptic curve.

The residue map $H^0(\mathbf{P}^2,\Omega^2_{\mathbf{P}^2}(\log D))\to H^0(D,\Omega^1_D)$ considered here is part of a linear map $H^2(\mathbf{P}^2-D,\mathbf{C})\to H^1(D,\mathbf{C})$, which may be called the "Gysin map". This is part of the Gysin sequence associated to any smooth divisor D in a complex manifold X:

$$\cdots \to H^{j-2}(D)\to H^j(X)\to H^j(X-D)\to H^{j-1}(D)\to\cdots.$$

== Historical terminology ==
In the 19th-century theory of elliptic functions, 1-forms with logarithmic poles were sometimes called integrals of the second kind (and, with an unfortunate inconsistency, sometimes differentials of the third kind). For example, the Weierstrass zeta function associated to a lattice $\Lambda$ in C was called an "integral of the second kind" to mean that it could be written

$$\zeta(z)=\frac{\sigma'(z)}{\sigma(z)}.$$

In modern terms, it follows that $\zeta(z)dz=d\sigma/\sigma$ is a 1-form on C with logarithmic poles on $\Lambda$, since $\Lambda$ is the zero set of the Weierstrass sigma function $\sigma(z).$

== Mixed Hodge theory for smooth varieties ==
Over the complex numbers, Deligne proved a strengthening of Alexander Grothendieck's algebraic de Rham theorem, relating coherent sheaf cohomology with singular cohomology. Namely, for any smooth scheme X over C with a divisor with simple normal crossings D, there is a natural isomorphism

$$H^k(X, \Omega^{\bullet}_X(\log D)) \cong H^k(X-D,\mathbf{C})$$

for each integer k, where the groups on the left are defined using the Zariski topology and the groups on the right use the classical (Euclidean) topology.

Moreover, when X is smooth and proper over C, the resulting spectral sequence

$$E_1^{pq} = H^q(X,\Omega^p_X(\log D)) \Rightarrow H^{p+q}(X-D,\mathbf{C})$$

degenerates at $E_1$. So the cohomology of $X-D$ with complex coefficients has a decreasing filtration, the Hodge filtration, whose associated graded vector spaces are the algebraically defined groups $H^q(X,\Omega^p_X(\log D))$.

This is part of the mixed Hodge structure which Deligne defined on the cohomology of any complex algebraic variety. In particular, there is also a weight filtration on the rational cohomology of $X-D$. The resulting filtration on $H^*(X-D,\mathbf{C})$ can be constructed using the logarithmic de Rham complex. Namely, define an increasing filtration $W_{\bullet} \Omega^p_X(\log D)$ by

$$W_{m}\Omega^p_X(\log D) =  \begin{cases}
0 & m < 0\\
\Omega^{p-m}_X\cdot \Omega^m_X(\log D) & 0\leq m \leq p\\
\Omega^p_X(\log D) & m\geq p.
\end{cases}$$

The resulting filtration on cohomology is the weight filtration:

$$W_mH^k(X-D, \mathbf{C}) = \text{Im}(H^k(X, W_{m-k}\Omega^{\bullet}_X(\log D))\rightarrow H^k(X-D,\mathbf{C})).$$

Building on these results, Hélène Esnault and Eckart Viehweg generalized the Kodaira–Akizuki–Nakano vanishing theorem in terms of logarithmic differentials. Namely, let X be a smooth complex projective variety of dimension n, D a divisor with simple normal crossings on X, and L an ample line bundle on X. Then

$$H^q(X,\Omega^p_X(\log D)\otimes L)=0$$

and

$$H^q(X,\Omega^p_X(\log D)\otimes O_X(-D)\otimes L)=0$$

for all $p+q>n$.

== See also ==
- Adjunction formula
- Borel–Moore homology
- Differential of the first kind
- Log structure
- Mixed Hodge structure
- Residue theorem
- Poincaré residue
