= Poincaré residue =

Generalized residue for several complex variables

In mathematics, the Poincaré residue is a generalization, to several complex variables and complex manifold theory, of the residue at a pole of complex function theory. It is just one of a number of such possible extensions.

Given a hypersurface $X \subset \mathbb{P}^n$ defined by a degree $d$ polynomial $F$ and a rational $n$-form $\omega$ on $\mathbb{P}^n$ with a pole of order $k > 0$ on $X$, then we can construct a cohomology class $\operatorname{Res}(\omega) \in H^{n-1}(X;\mathbb{C})$. If $n=1$ we recover the classical residue construction.

== Historical construction ==
When Poincaré first introduced residues he was studying period integrals of the form

$\underset{\Gamma}\iint \omega$ for $\Gamma \in H_2(\mathbb{P}^2 - D)$

where $\omega$ was a rational differential form with poles along a divisor $D$. He was able to make the reduction of this integral to an integral of the form

$\int_\gamma \text{Res}(\omega)$ for $\gamma \in H_1(D)$

where $\Gamma = T(\gamma)$, sending $\gamma$ to the boundary of a solid $\varepsilon$-tube around $\gamma$ on the smooth locus $D^*$of the divisor. If

$\omega = \frac{q(x,y)dx\wedge dy}{p(x,y)}$

on an affine chart where $p(x,y)$ is irreducible of degree $N$ and $\deg q(x,y) \leq N-3$ (so there is no poles on the line at infinity ^{page 150}). Then, he gave a formula for computing this residue as

$\text{Res}(\omega) = -\frac{qdx}{\partial p / \partial y} = \frac{qdy}{\partial p / \partial x}$

which are both cohomologous forms.

== Construction ==
=== Preliminary definition ===
Given the setup in the introduction, let $A^p_k(X)$ be the space of meromorphic $p$-forms on $\mathbb{P}^n$ which have poles of order up to $k$. Notice that the standard differential $d$ sends

$$d: A^{p-1}_{k-1}(X) \to A^p_k(X)$$

Define

$$\mathcal{K}_k(X)  = \frac{A^p_k(X)}{dA^{p-1}_{k-1}(X)}$$

as the rational de-Rham cohomology groups. They form a filtration

$\mathcal{K}_1(X) \subset \mathcal{K}_2(X) \subset \cdots \subset \mathcal{K}_n(X) = H^{n+1}(\mathbb{P}^{n+1}-X)$

corresponding to the Hodge filtration.

=== Definition of residue ===
Consider an $(n-1)$-cycle $\gamma \in H_{n-1}(X;\mathbb{C})$. We take a tube $T(\gamma)$ around $\gamma$ (which is locally isomorphic to $\gamma\times S^1$) that lies within the complement of $X$. Since this is an $n$-cycle, we can integrate a rational $n$-form $\omega$ and get a number. If we write this as

$$\int_{T(-)}\omega : H_{n-1}(X;\mathbb{C}) \to \mathbb{C}$$

then we get a linear transformation on the homology classes. Homology/cohomology duality implies that this is a cohomology class

$$\operatorname{Res}(\omega) \in H^{n-1}(X;\mathbb{C})$$

which we call the residue. Notice if we restrict to the case $n=1$, this is just the standard residue from complex analysis (although we extend our meromorphic $1$-form to all of $\mathbb{P}^1$. This definition can be summarized as the map

$\text{Res}: H^{n}(\mathbb{P}^{n}\setminus X) \to H^{n-1}(X)$

=== Algorithm for computing this class ===
There is a simple recursive method for computing the residues which reduces to the classical case of $n=1$. Recall that the residue of a $1$-form

$$\operatorname{Res}\left(\frac{dz} z  + a\right) = 1$$

If we consider a chart containing $X$ where it is the vanishing locus of $w$, we can write a meromorphic $n$-form with pole on $X$ as

$$\frac{dw}{w^k}\wedge \rho$$

Then we can write it out as

$$\frac{1}{(k-1)}\left( \frac{d\rho}{w^{k-1}} + d\left(\frac{\rho}{w^{k-1}}\right) \right)$$

This shows that the two cohomology classes

$$\left[ \frac{dw}{w^k}\wedge \rho \right] = \left[ \frac{d\rho}{(k-1)w^{k-1}} \right]$$

are equal. We have thus reduced the order of the pole hence we can use recursion to get a pole of order $1$ and define the residue of $\omega$ as

$$\operatorname{Res}\left( \alpha \wedge \frac{dw} w + \beta \right) = \alpha|_X$$

== Example ==
For example, consider the curve $X \subset \mathbb{P}^2$ defined by the polynomial

$$F_t(x,y,z) = t(x^3 + y^3 + z^3) - 3xyz$$

Then, we can apply the previous algorithm to compute the residue of

$$\omega = \frac{\Omega}{F_t} = \frac{x\,dy\wedge dz - y \, dx\wedge dz + z \, dx\wedge dy}{t(x^3 + y^3 + z^3) - 3xyz}$$

Since

$$\begin{align}
-z\,dy\wedge\left( \frac{\partial F_t}{\partial x} \, dx + \frac{\partial F_t}{\partial y} \, dy + \frac{\partial F_t}{\partial z} \, dz \right) &=z\frac{\partial F_t}{\partial x} \, dx\wedge dy - z \frac{\partial F_t}{\partial z} \, dy\wedge dz \\
y \, dz\wedge\left(\frac{\partial F_t}{\partial x} \, dx + \frac{\partial F_t}{\partial y} \, dy + \frac{\partial F_t}{\partial z} \, dz\right) &= -y\frac{\partial F_t}{\partial x} \, dx\wedge dz - y \frac{\partial F_t}{\partial y} \, dy\wedge dz
\end{align}$$

and

$$3F_t - z\frac{\partial F_t}{\partial x} - y\frac{\partial F_t}{\partial y} = x \frac{\partial F_t}{\partial x}$$

we have that

$$\omega = \frac{y\,dz - z\,dy}{\partial F_t / \partial x} \wedge \frac{dF_t}{F_t} + \frac{3\,dy\wedge dz}{\partial F_t/\partial x}$$

This implies that

$$\operatorname{Res}(\omega) = \frac{y\,dz - z\,dy}{\partial F_t / \partial x}$$

== See also ==
- Grothendieck residue
- Leray residue
- Bott residue
- Sheaf of logarithmic differential forms
- normal crossing singularity
- Adjunction formula#Poincare residue
- Hodge structure
- Jacobian ideal
