= Adjunction formula =

Concept in algebraic geometry

In mathematics, especially in algebraic geometry and the theory of complex manifolds, the adjunction formula relates the canonical bundle of a variety and a hypersurface inside that variety. It is often used to deduce facts about varieties embedded in well-behaved spaces such as projective space or to prove theorems by induction.

== Adjunction for smooth varieties ==
=== Formula for a smooth subvariety ===
Let X be a smooth algebraic variety or smooth complex manifold and Y be a smooth subvariety of X. Denote the inclusion map Y → X by i and the ideal sheaf of Y in X by $\mathcal{I}$. The conormal exact sequence for i is

$$0 \to \mathcal{I}/\mathcal{I}^2 \to i^*\Omega_X \to \Omega_Y \to 0,$$

where Ω denotes a cotangent bundle. The determinant of this exact sequence is a natural isomorphism

$$\omega_Y = i^*\omega_X \otimes \operatorname{det}(\mathcal{I}/\mathcal{I}^2)^\vee,$$

where $\vee$ denotes the dual of a line bundle.

=== The particular case of a smooth divisor ===
Suppose that D is a smooth divisor on X. Its normal bundle extends to a line bundle $\mathcal{O}(D)$ on X, and the ideal sheaf of D corresponds to its dual $\mathcal{O}(-D)$. The conormal bundle $\mathcal{I}/\mathcal{I}^2$ is $i^*\mathcal{O}(-D)$, which, combined with the formula above, gives

$$\omega_D = i^*(\omega_X \otimes \mathcal{O}(D)).$$

In terms of canonical classes, this says that

$$K_D = (K_X + D)|_D.$$

Both of these two formulas are called the adjunction formula.

== Examples ==
=== Degree d hypersurfaces ===
Given a smooth degree $d$ hypersurface $i: X \hookrightarrow \mathbb{P}^n_S$ we can compute its canonical and anti-canonical bundles using the adjunction formula. This reads as

$\omega_X \cong i^*\omega_{\mathbb{P}^n}\otimes \mathcal{O}_X(d)$

which is isomorphic to $\mathcal{O}_X(-n{-}1{+}d)$.

=== Complete intersections ===
For a smooth complete intersection $i: X \hookrightarrow \mathbb{P}^n_S$ of degrees $(d_1, d_2)$, the conormal bundle $\mathcal{I}/\mathcal{I}^2$ is isomorphic to $\mathcal{O}(-d_1)\oplus \mathcal{O}(-d_2)$, so the determinant bundle is $\mathcal{O}(-d_1{-}d_2)$ and its dual is $\mathcal{O}(d_1{+}d_2)$, showing

$\omega_X \,\cong\, \mathcal{O}_X(-n{-}1)\otimes \mathcal{O}_X(d_1{+}d_2) \,\cong\, \mathcal{O}_X(-n{-}1 {+} d_1 {+} d_2).$

This generalizes in the same fashion for all complete intersections.

=== Curves in a quadric surface ===
$\mathbb{P}^1\times\mathbb{P}^1$ embeds into $\mathbb{P}^3$ as a quadric surface given by the vanishing locus of a quadratic polynomial coming from a non-singular symmetric matrix. We can then restrict our attention to curves on $Y= \mathbb{P}^1\times\mathbb{P}^1$. We can compute the cotangent bundle of $Y$ using the direct sum of the cotangent bundles on each $\mathbb{P}^1$, so it is $\mathcal{O}(-2,0)\oplus\mathcal{O}(0,-2)$. Then, the canonical sheaf is given by $\mathcal{O}(-2,-2)$, which can be found using the decomposition of wedges of direct sums of vector bundles. Then, using the adjunction formula, a curve defined by the vanishing locus of a section $f \in \Gamma(\mathcal{O}(a,b))$, can be computed as

$$\omega_C \,\cong\, \mathcal{O}(-2,-2)\otimes \mathcal{O}_C(a,b) \,\cong\, \mathcal{O}_C(a{-}2, b{-}2).$$

== Poincaré residue ==
The restriction map $\omega_X \otimes \mathcal{O}(D) \to \omega_D$ is called the Poincaré residue. Suppose that X is a complex manifold. Then on sections, the Poincaré residue can be expressed as follows. Fix an open set U on which D is given by the vanishing of a function f. Any section over U of $\mathcal{O}(D)$ can be written as s/f, where s is a holomorphic function on U. Let η be a section over U of ω_{X}. The Poincaré residue is the map

$$\eta \otimes \frac{s}{f} \mapsto s\frac{\partial\eta}{\partial f}\bigg|_{f = 0},$$

that is, it is formed by applying the vector field ∂/∂f to the volume form η, then multiplying by the holomorphic function s. If U admits local coordinates z_{1}, ..., z_{n} such that for some i, ∂f/∂z_{i} ≠ 0, then this can also be expressed as

$$\frac{g(z)\,dz_1 \wedge \dotsb \wedge dz_n}{f(z)} \mapsto (-1)^{i-1}\frac{g(z)\,dz_1 \wedge \dotsb \wedge \widehat{dz_i} \wedge \dotsb \wedge dz_n}{\partial f/\partial z_i}\bigg|_{f = 0}.$$

Another way of viewing Poincaré residue first reinterprets the adjunction formula as an isomorphism

$$\omega_D \otimes i^*\mathcal{O}(-D) = i^*\omega_X.$$

On an open set U as before, a section of $i^*\mathcal{O}(-D)$ is the product of a holomorphic function s with the form df/f. The Poincaré residue is the map that takes the wedge product of a section of ω_{D} and a section of $i^*\mathcal{O}(-D)$.

== Inversion of adjunction ==
The adjunction formula is false when the conormal exact sequence is not a short exact sequence. However, it is possible to use this failure to relate the singularities of X with the singularities of D. Theorems of this type are called inversion of adjunction. They are an important tool in modern birational geometry.

== The canonical divisor of a plane curve ==
Let $C \subset \mathbf{P}^2$ be a smooth plane curve cut out by a degree $d$ homogeneous polynomial $F(X, Y, Z)$. We claim that the canonical divisor is $K = (d-3)[C \cap H]$ where $H$ is the hyperplane divisor.

First work in the affine chart $Z \neq 0$. The equation becomes $f(x, y) = F(x, y, 1) = 0$ where $x = X/Z$ and $y = Y/Z$. We will explicitly compute the divisor of the differential

$$\omega := \frac{dx}{\partial f / \partial y} = \frac{-dy}{\partial f / \partial x}.$$

At any point $(x_0, y_0)$ either $\partial f / \partial y \neq 0$ so $x - x_0$ is a local parameter or $\partial f / \partial x \neq 0$ so $y - y_0$ is a local parameter. In both cases the order of vanishing of $\omega$ at the point is zero. Thus all contributions to the divisor $\text{div}(\omega)$ are at the line at infinity, $Z = 0$.

Now look on the line ${Z = 0}$. Assume that $[1, 0, 0] \not\in C$ so it suffices to look in the chart $Y \neq 0$ with coordinates $u = 1/y$ and $v = x/y$. The equation of the curve becomes

$$g(u, v) = F(v, 1, u) = F(x/y, 1, 1/y) = y^{-d}F(x, y, 1) = y^{-d}f(x, y).$$

Hence

$$\partial f/\partial x = y^d \frac{\partial g}{\partial v} \frac{\partial v}{\partial x} = y^{d-1}\frac{\partial g}{\partial v}$$

so

$$\omega = \frac{-dy}{\partial f / \partial x} = \frac{1}{u^2} \frac{du}{y^{d-1}\partial g/ \partial v} = u^{d-3} \frac{du}{\partial g / \partial v}$$

with order of vanishing $\nu_p(\omega) = (d-3)\nu_p(u)$. Hence $\text{div}(\omega) = (d-3)[C \cap \{Z = 0\}]$ which agrees with the adjunction formula.

== Applications to curves ==
The genus-degree formula for plane curves can be deduced from the adjunction formula. Let C ⊂ P^{2} be a smooth plane curve of degree d and genus g. Let H be the class of a hyperplane in P^{2}, that is, the class of a line. The canonical class of P^{2} is −3H. Consequently, the adjunction formula says that the restriction of (d − 3)H to C equals the canonical class of C. This restriction is the same as the intersection product (d − 3)H ⋅ dH restricted to C, and so the degree of the canonical class of C is d(d−3). By the Riemann–Roch theorem, g − 1 = (d−3)d − g + 1, which implies the formula

$$g = \tfrac12(d{-} 1)(d {-} 2).$$

Similarly, if C is a smooth curve on the quadric surface P^{1}×P^{1} with bidegree (d_{1},d_{2}) (meaning d_{1},d_{2} are its intersection degrees with a fiber of each projection to P^{1}), since the canonical class of P^{1}×P^{1} has bidegree (−2,−2), the adjunction formula shows that the canonical class of C is the intersection product of divisors of bidegrees (d_{1},d_{2}) and (d_{1}−2,d_{2}−2). The intersection form on P^{1}×P^{1} is $((d_1,d_2),(e_1,e_2))\mapsto d_1 e_2 + d_2 e_1$ by definition of the bidegree and by bilinearity, so applying Riemann–Roch gives $2g-2 = d_1(d_2{-}2) + d_2(d_1{-}2)$ or

$$g = (d_1 {-} 1)(d_2 {-} 1) \,=\, d_1 d_2 - d_1 - d_2 + 1.$$

The genus of a curve C which is the complete intersection of two surfaces D and E in P^{3} can also be computed using the adjunction formula. Suppose that d and e are the degrees of D and E, respectively. Applying the adjunction formula to D shows that its canonical divisor is (d − 4)H|_{D}, which is the intersection product of (d − 4)H and D. Doing this again with E, which is possible because C is a complete intersection, shows that the canonical divisor C is the product (d + e − 4)H ⋅ dH ⋅ eH, that is, it has degree de(d + e − 4). By the Riemann–Roch theorem, this implies that the genus of C is

$$g = de(d + e - 4) / 2 + 1.$$

More generally, if C is the complete intersection of n − 1 hypersurfaces D_{1}, ..., D_{n − 1} of degrees d_{1}, ..., d_{n − 1} in P^{n}, then an inductive computation shows that the canonical class of C is $(d_1 + \cdots + d_{n-1} - n - 1)d_1 \cdots d_{n-1} H^{n-1}$. The Riemann–Roch theorem implies that the genus of this curve is

$$g = 1 + \tfrac{1}{2}(d_1 + \cdots + d_{n-1} - n - 1)d_1 \cdots d_{n-1}.$$

== In low dimensional topology ==
Let S be a complex surface (in particular a 4-dimensional manifold) and let $C\to S$ be a smooth (non-singular) connected complex curve. Then

$2g(C)-2=[C]^2-c_1(S)[C]$

where $g(C)$ is the genus of C, $[C]^2$ denotes the self-intersections and $c_1(S)[C]$ denotes the Kronecker pairing $\left\langle c_1(S),[C]\right\rangle$.

== See also ==
- Logarithmic form
- Poincaré residue
- Thom conjecture
