= Jacobian ideal =

In mathematics, the Jacobian ideal or gradient ideal is the ideal generated by the Jacobian of a function or function germ. Let $\mathcal{O}(x_1,\ldots,x_n)$ denote the ring of smooth functions in $n$ variables and $f$ a function in the ring. The Jacobian ideal of $f$ is

$$J_f := \left\langle \frac{\partial f}{\partial x_1}, \ldots, \frac{\partial f}{\partial x_n} \right\rangle.$$

== Relation to deformation theory ==
In deformation theory, the deformations of a hypersurface given by a polynomial $f$ is classified by the ring
$$\frac{\mathbb{C}[x_1, \ldots, x_n]}{(f) + J_f}.$$
This is shown using the Kodaira–Spencer map.

== Relation to Hodge theory ==
In Hodge theory, there are objects called real Hodge structures which are the data of a real vector space $H_\mathbb{R}$ and an increasing filtration $F^\bullet$ of $H_\mathbb{C} = H_\mathbb{R}\otimes_{\mathbb{R}}\mathbb{C}$ satisfying a list of compatibility structures. For a smooth projective variety $X$ there is a canonical Hodge structure.

=== Statement for degree d hypersurfaces ===
In the special case $X$ is defined by a homogeneous degree $d$ polynomial $f \in \Gamma(\mathbb{P}^{n+1},\mathcal{O}(d))$ this Hodge structure can be understood completely from the Jacobian ideal. For its graded-pieces, this is given by the map
$$\mathbb{C}[Z_0,\ldots, Z_n]^{(d(n-1+p) - (n+2))} \to \frac{F^pH^n(X,\mathbb{C})}{F^{p+1}H^n(X,\mathbb{C})}$$
which is surjective on the primitive cohomology, denoted $\text{Prim}^{p,n-p}(X)$ and has the kernel $J_f$. Note the primitive cohomology classes are the classes of $X$ which do not come from $\mathbb{P}^{n+1}$, which is just the Lefschetz class $[L]^n = c_1(\mathcal{O}(1))^d$.

=== Sketch of proof ===
==== Reduction to residue map ====
For $X \subset \mathbb{P}^{n+1}$ there is an associated short exact sequence of complexes
$$0 \to \Omega_{\mathbb{P}^{n+1}}^\bullet \to \Omega_{\mathbb{P}^{n+1}}^\bullet(\log X) \xrightarrow{res} \Omega_X^\bullet[-1] \to 0$$
where the middle complex is the complex of sheaves of logarithmic forms and the right-hand map is the residue map. This has an associated long exact sequence in cohomology. From the Lefschetz hyperplane theorem there is only one interesting cohomology group of $X$, which is $H^n(X;\mathbb{C}) = \mathbb{H}^n(X;\Omega_X^\bullet)$. From the long exact sequence of this short exact sequence, there the induced residue map
$$\mathbb{H}^{n+1}\left(\mathbb{P}^{n+1}, \Omega^\bullet_{\mathbb{P}^{n+1}}(\log X)\right) \to
\mathbb{H}^{n+1}(\mathbb{P}^{n+1},\Omega^\bullet_X[-1])$$
where the right hand side is equal to $\mathbb{H}^{n}(\mathbb{P}^{n+1},\Omega^\bullet_X)$, which is isomorphic to $\mathbb{H}^n(X;\Omega_X^\bullet)$. Also, there is an isomorphism
$$H^{n+1}_{dR}(\mathbb{P}^{n+1}-X) \cong \mathbb{H}^{n+1}\left(\mathbb{P}^{n+1};\Omega_{\mathbb{P}^{n+1}}^\bullet(\log X)\right)$$
Through these isomorphisms there is an induced residue map
$$res: H^{n+1}_{dR}(\mathbb{P}^{n+1}-X) \to H^n(X;\mathbb{C})$$
which is injective, and surjective on primitive cohomology. Also, there is the Hodge decomposition
$$H^{n+1}_{dR}(\mathbb{P}^{n+1}-X) \cong
\bigoplus_{p+q = n+1}H^q(\Omega_{\mathbb{P}}^p(\log X))$$
and $H^q(\Omega_{\mathbb{P}}^p(\log X)) \cong \text{Prim}^{p-1,q}(X)$.

==== Computation of de Rham cohomology group ====
In turns out the de Rham cohomology group $H^{n+1}_{dR}(\mathbb{P}^{n+1}-X)$ is much more tractable and has an explicit description in terms of polynomials. The $F^p$ part is spanned by the meromorphic forms having poles of order $\leq n - p + 1$ which surjects onto the $F^p$ part of $\text{Prim}^n(X)$. This comes from the reduction isomorphism
$$F^{p+1}H^{n+1}_{dR}(\mathbb{P}^{n+1}-X;\mathbb{C}) \cong \frac{
\Gamma(\Omega_{\mathbb{P}^{n+1}}(n-p+1))
}{
d\Gamma(\Omega_{\mathbb{P}^{n+1}}(n-p))
}$$
Using the canonical $(n+1)$-form
$$\Omega = \sum_{j=0}^n (-1)^j Z_j dZ_0\wedge \cdots \wedge \hat{dZ_j}\wedge \cdots \wedge dZ_{n+1}$$
on $\mathbb{P}^{n+1}$ where the $\hat{dZ_j}$ denotes the deletion from the index, these meromorphic differential forms look like
$$\frac{A}{f^{n-p+1}}\Omega$$
where
$$\begin{align}
\text{deg}(A) &= (n-p+1)\cdot\text{deg}(f) - \text{deg}(\Omega) \\
&= (n-p+1)\cdot d - (n + 2) \\
&= d(n-p+1) - (n+2)
\end{align}$$
Finally, it turns out the kernel ^{Lemma 8.11} is of all polynomials of the form $A' + fB$ where $A' \in J_f$. Note the Euler identity
$$f = \sum Z_j \frac{\partial f}{\partial Z_j}$$
shows $f \in J_f$.

== See also ==
- Milnor number
- Hodge structure
- Kodaira–Spencer map
- Gauss–Manin connection
- Unfolding
