= De Rham theorem =

Theorem

In mathematics, more specifically in differential geometry, the de Rham theorem says that the ring homomorphism from the de Rham cohomology to the singular cohomology given by integration is an isomorphism.

The Poincaré lemma implies that the de Rham cohomology is the sheaf cohomology with the constant sheaf $\mathbb{R}$. Thus, for abstract reason, the de Rham cohomology is isomorphic as a group to the singular cohomology. But the de Rham theorem gives a more explicit isomorphism between the two cohomologies; thus, connecting analysis and topology more directly.

== Statement ==
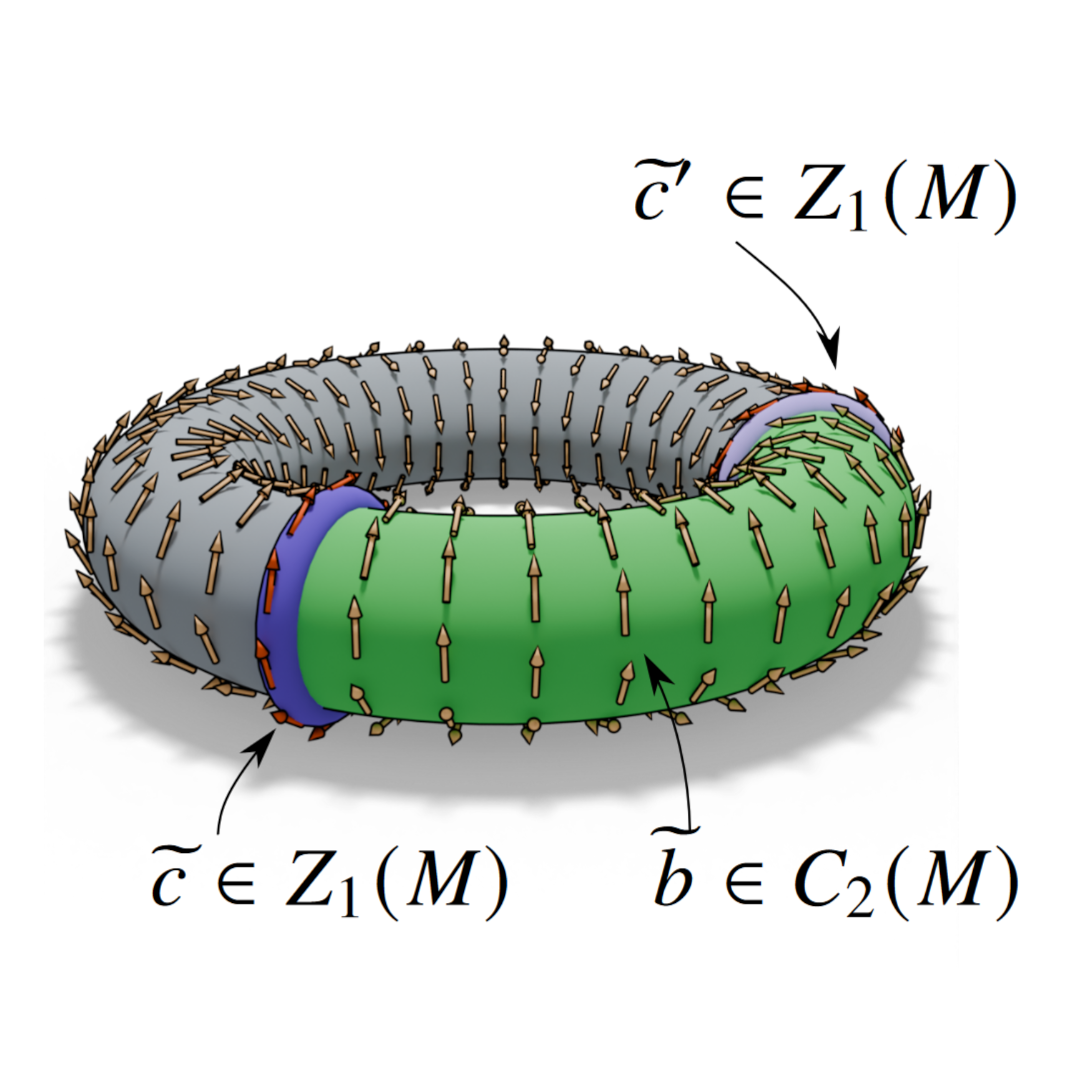
The de Rham homomorphism is well defined because for any $\widetilde{c}, \widetilde{c}'$ representing the same homology class $\widetilde{c} - \widetilde{c}' = \partial \widetilde{b}$, so $\int_{\widetilde{c}} \omega - \int_{\widetilde{c}'} \omega = 0'$ and if $\omega$ is an exact form then $\int_{\widetilde{c}} \omega = 0$

The key part of the theorem is a construction of the de Rham homomorphism. Let M be a manifold. Then there is a map

$$k : \Omega^p(M) \to S^p_{\mathcal{C}^{\infty}}(M)$$

from the space of differential p-forms to the space of smooth singular p-cochains given by

$$\omega \mapsto \left(\sigma \mapsto \int_{\sigma} \omega \right).$$

Stokes' formula implies: $k \circ d = \partial \circ k$; i.e., $k$ is a chain map and so it induces:

$$[k] : \operatorname{H}_{\textrm{de Rham}}^*(M) \to \operatorname{H}^*_{\infty-\mathrm{sing}}(M)$$

where these cohomologies are the cohomologies with real coefficients of $\Omega^*(M)$ and $S^*_{\mathcal{C}^{\infty}}(M)$, respectively. As it turns out, $[k]$ is a ring homomorphism and is called the de Rham homomorphism. It is not difficult to show that the de Rham homomorphism is a natural transformation between the de Rham cohomology functor and the singular cohomology functor.

Finally, the theorem says that the induced homomorphism $[k]$ is an isomorphism (i.e., bijective).

There is also a variant of the theorem that says the de Rham cohomology of M is isomorphic as a ring with the Čech cohomology of it. This Čech version is essentially due to André Weil.

== Discussion ==
When considering singular cohomologies with coefficients in another abelian group, for example the integers, then of course one should not expect similar isomorphism. The Klein bottle for example has a homology group $H_1(K)=\mathbb{Z}\oplus \mathbb{Z}_2$, and since the cohomology with real coefficients does not account for any finite (more generally, torsion) groups, we have $H^1(K;\mathbb{R})=\mathbb{R}$. This indeed coincides with the corresponding de Rham cohomology group.

As stated above, the de Rham homomorphism is isomorphism between the de Rham cohomology and the smooth singular cohomology with real coefficients, that is the cohomology with respect to smooth chains. However, a technical result implies that the singular homology groups coincide with smooth singular homology groups. This shows that the de Rham theorem actually implies isomorphism between de Rham cohomology and (nonsmooth) singular cohomology groups (with real coefficients).

== Idea of proof ==
One proof roughly follows these ideas: Call a manifold "de Rham", if the theorem holds for it. Call an open cover of a manifold a "de Rham cover", if all elements of the cover are de Rham, as well as all of their finite intersections. One shows that convex sets in $\mathbb{R}^n$ are de Rham, basically by the homotopy invariance of both cohomologies in question. Next, one shows inductively that manifolds having finite de Rham cover are de Rham, using the Mayer-Vietoris sequence. Then the result is being extended to manifolds having a basis which is a de Rham cover. This step is more technical. Finally, one easily shows that open subsets of $\mathbb{R}^n$ and consequently any manifold has a basis which is a de Rham cover. Thus, invoking the previous step, finishes the proof.

Here is another proof sketch, based on sheaf-theory: There are two important complexes of sheaves on our manifold $M$ (in which categories do these complexes live is a subtle problem, let us be vague at first). The first one is the de Rham complex $\Omega^{\bullet}_M$, which is given by the sheaves of $C^{\infty}$-differential forms on $M$. The second one is the singular complex $C^{\bullet}_{sing}$, which is the given by the sheaves of singular cochains of $M$, and is the relative version over $M$ of the cochain complex of abelian groups. Integration over simplices give us a morphism of sheaves of complexes $\int:\Omega_M^{\bullet}\to C_{sing}^{\bullet}$. Since both objects admit partition of unities, it is a standard fact that the second pages of the hypercohomology spectral sequences for both of them only have one nonzero column each, thus the hypercohomologies of the two complexes of sheaves indeed calculates the de Rham and singular cohomologies of $M$. Therefore, to prove the de Rham theorem, it suffices to show that $\int$ is an isomorphism. To this end, we note that there are natural morphisms from the constant sheaf $\underline{\mathbb{R}}$ to $\Omega_M^{\bullet}$ and $C_{sing}^{\bullet}$, and the obvious triangle commutes. Furthermore, by local contractibility of both the de Rham and singular cohomologies, the natural morphisms are indeed isomorphisms. By the commutativity of the triangle, we have shown the desired isomorphy of $\int$, and the proof is complete, except that we need to return to the subtle problem at the beginning: in which category of sheaves of complexes do the argument above make sense? Since we have used local contractibility of cohomologies to conclude the isomorphy of the two morphisms going out of $\underline{\mathbb{R}}$, the actual category of sheaves of complexes cannot work, and we need to pass to the derived category. However, although the final result is true in the triangulated derived 1-category, for the argument above to work well, the derived 1-category is not enough. For example, isomorphisms in the derived 1-category cannot be checked locally over $M$, but we concluded the isomorphy of the two morphisms going out of $\underline{\mathbb{R}}$ by checking it locally. In summary, we need a category which, on the one hand, makes cohomological isomorphisms into actual isomorphisms, and on the other hand, satisfies descent. The derived $\infty$-category turns out to be the correct notion.

== Singular-homology version ==
There is also a version of the theorem involving singular homology instead of cohomology. It says the pairing

$$(\omega, \sigma) \mapsto \int_{\sigma} \omega$$

induces a perfect pairing between the de Rham cohomology and the (smooth) singular homology; namely,

$$\operatorname{H}^*_{\mathrm{deRham}}(M) \to \operatorname{H}_*^{\mathrm{sing}}(M)^*, \, [\omega] \mapsto \left([\sigma] \mapsto \int_{\sigma} \omega \right)$$

is an isomorphism of vector spaces.

This theorem has the following consequence (familiar from calculus); namely, a closed differential form is exact if and only if the integrations of it over arbitrary cycles are all zero. For a one-form, it means that a closed one-form $\omega$ is exact (i.e., admits a potential function) if and only if $\int_{\gamma} \omega$ is independent of a path $\gamma$. This is exactly a statement in calculus.

== Current version ==
There is also a current (a differential form with distributional coefficients) version of the de Rham theorem, which says the singular cohomology can be computed as the cohomology of the complex of currents. This version is weaker in the sense that the isomorphism is not a ring homomorphism (since currents cannot be multiplied and so the space of currents is not a ring).
