= Genus–degree formula =

Theorem in classical algebraic geometry

In classical algebraic geometry, the genus–degree formula relates the degree $d$ of an irreducible plane curve $C$ with its arithmetic genus $g$ via the formula:

$$g=\frac12 (d-1)(d-2).$$

Here "plane curve" means that $C$ is a closed curve in the projective plane $\mathbb{P}^2$. If the curve is non-singular, then the geometric genus and the arithmetic genus are equal, but if the curve is singular, with only ordinary singularities, then the geometric genus is smaller. More precisely, an ordinary singularity of multiplicity $r$ decreases the genus by $\frac12 r(r-1)$.

== Motivation ==
Elliptic curves are parametrized by Weierstrass elliptic functions. Since these parameterizing functions are doubly periodic, the elliptic curve can be identified with a period parallelogram with the sides glued together i.e. a torus. So the genus of an elliptic curve is 1. The genus–degree formula is a generalization of this fact to higher genus curves. The basic idea would be to use higher degree equations. Consider the quartic equation
$$\left(y^2-x(x-1)(x-2)\right)\,(5 y-x)+\epsilon x=0.$$
For small nonzero $\varepsilon$ this is gives the nonsingular curve. However, when $\varepsilon=0$, this is
$$\left(y^2-x(x-1)(x-2)\right)\,(5 y-x)=0,$$
a reducible curve (the union of a nonsingular cubic and a line). When the points of infinity are added, we get a line meeting the cubic in 3 points. The complex picture of this reducible curve looks like a torus and a sphere touching at 3 points. As $\varepsilon$ changes to nonzero values, the points of contact open up into tubes connecting the torus and sphere, adding 2 handles to the torus, resulting in a genus 3 curve.

In general, if $g(d)$ is the genus of a curve of degree $d$ nonsingular curve, then proceeding as above, we obtain a nonsingular curve of degree $d+1$ by $\varepsilon$-smoothing the union of a curve of degree $d$ and a line. The line meets the degree $d$ curve in $d$ points, so this leads to the recursion
$$g(d+1)=g(d)+d-1,\quad g(1)=0.$$
This recursion has the solution $g(d)=\frac12(d-1)(d-2)$.

== Proof ==
The genus–degree formula can be proved from the adjunction formula; for details, see Adjunction formula § Applications to curves.

== Generalization ==
For a non-singular hypersurface $H$ of degree $d$ in the projective space $\mathbb{P}^n$ of arithmetic genus $g$ the formula becomes:

$$g=\binom{d-1}{n} , \,$$

where $\tbinom{d-1}{n}$ is the binomial coefficient.

== See also ==
- Thom conjecture
