= Period mapping =

In mathematics, in the field of algebraic geometry, the period mapping relates families of Kähler manifolds to families of Hodge structures.

== Ehresmann's theorem ==
Let f : X → B be a holomorphic submersive morphism. For a point b of B, we denote the fiber of f over b by X_{b}. Fix a point 0 in B. Ehresmann's theorem guarantees that there is a small open neighborhood U around 0 in which f becomes a fiber bundle. That is, f^{−1}(U) is diffeomorphic to X_{0} × U. In particular, the composite map

$$X_b \hookrightarrow f^{-1}(U) \cong X_0 \times U \twoheadrightarrow X_0$$

is a diffeomorphism. This diffeomorphism is not unique because it depends on the choice of trivialization. The trivialization is constructed from smooth paths in U, and it can be shown that the homotopy class of the diffeomorphism depends only on the choice of a homotopy class of paths from b to 0. In particular, if U is contractible, there is a well-defined diffeomorphism up to homotopy.

The diffeomorphism from X_{b} to X_{0} induces an isomorphism of cohomology groups

$$H^k(X_b, \mathbf{Z}) \cong H^k(X_b \times U, \mathbf{Z}) \cong H^k(X_0 \times U, \mathbf{Z}) \cong H^k(X_0, \mathbf{Z}),$$

and since homotopic maps induce identical maps on cohomology, this isomorphism depends only on the homotopy class of the path from b to 0.

== Local unpolarized period mappings ==
Assume that f is proper and that X_{0} is a Kähler variety. The Kähler condition is open, so after possibly shrinking U, X_{b} is compact and Kähler for all b in U. After shrinking U further we may assume that it is contractible. Then there is a well-defined isomorphism between the cohomology groups of X_{0} and X_{b}. These isomorphisms of cohomology groups will not in general preserve the Hodge structures of X_{0} and X_{b} because they are induced by diffeomorphisms, not biholomorphisms. Let F^{p}H^{k}(X_{b}, C) denote the pth step of the Hodge filtration. The Hodge numbers of X_{b} are the same as those of X_{0}, so the number b_{p,k} = dim F^{p}H^{k}(X_{b}, C) is independent of b. The period map is the map

$$\mathcal{P} : U \rarr F = F_{b_{1,k}, \ldots, b_{k,k}}(H^k(X_0, \mathbf{C})),$$

where F is the flag variety of chains of subspaces of dimensions b_{p,k} for all p, that sends

$$b \mapsto (F^pH^k(X_b, \mathbf{C}))_p.$$

Because X_{b} is a Kähler manifold, the Hodge filtration satisfies the Hodge–Riemann bilinear relations. These imply that

$$H^k(X_b, \mathbf{C}) = F^pH^k(X_b, \mathbf{C}) \oplus \overline{F^{k-p+1}H^k(X_b, \mathbf{C})}.$$

Not all flags of subspaces satisfy this condition. The subset of the flag variety satisfying this condition is called the unpolarized local period domain and is denoted $\mathcal{D}$. $\mathcal{D}$ is an open subset of the flag variety F.

== Local polarized period mappings ==
Assume now not just that each X_{b} is Kähler, but that there is a Kähler class that varies holomorphically in b. In other words, assume there is a class ω in H^{2}(X, Z) such that for every b, the restriction ω_{b} of ω to X_{b} is a Kähler class. ω_{b} determines a bilinear form Q on H^{k}(X_{b}, C) by the rule

$$Q(\xi, \eta) = \int \omega_b^{n-k} \wedge \xi \wedge \eta.$$

This form varies holomorphically in b, and consequently the image of the period mapping satisfies additional constraints which again come from the Hodge–Riemann bilinear relations. These are:

1. Orthogonality: F^{p}H^{k}(X_{b}, C) is orthogonal to F^{k − p + 1}H^{k}(X_{b}, C) with respect to Q.
2. Positive definiteness: For all p + q = k, the restriction of $\textstyle (-1)^{k(k-1)/2}i^{p-q}Q$ to the primitive classes of type (p, q) is positive definite.

The polarized local period domain is the subset of the unpolarized local period domain whose flags satisfy these additional conditions. The first condition is a closed condition, and the second is an open condition, and consequently the polarized local period domain is a locally closed subset of the unpolarized local period domain and of the flag variety F. The period mapping is defined in the same way as before.

The polarized local period domain and the polarized period mapping are still denoted $\mathcal{D}$ and $\mathcal{P}$, respectively.

== Global period mappings ==
Focusing only on local period mappings ignores the information present in the topology of the base space B. The global period mappings are constructed so that this information is still available. The difficulty in constructing global period mappings comes from the monodromy of B: There is no longer a unique homotopy class of diffeomorphisms relating the fibers X_{b} and X_{0}. Instead, distinct homotopy classes of paths in B induce possibly distinct homotopy classes of diffeomorphisms and therefore possibly distinct isomorphisms of cohomology groups. Consequently there is no longer a well-defined flag for each fiber. Instead, the flag is defined only up to the action of the fundamental group.

In the unpolarized case, define the monodromy group Γ to be the subgroup of GL(H^{k}(X_{0}, Z)) consisting of all automorphisms induced by a homotopy class of curves in B as above. The flag variety is a quotient of a Lie group by a parabolic subgroup, and the monodromy group is an arithmetic subgroup of the Lie group. The global unpolarized period domain is the quotient of the local unpolarized period domain by the action of Γ (it is thus a collection of double cosets). In the polarized case, the elements of the monodromy group are required to also preserve the bilinear form Q, and the global polarized period domain is constructed as a quotient by Γ in the same way. In both cases, the period mapping takes a point of B to the class of the Hodge filtration on X_{b}.

== Properties ==
Griffiths proved that the period map is holomorphic. His transversality theorem limits the range of the period map.

Period maps are in fact quasiprojective varieties, because they are o-minimally definable.

== Period matrices ==
The Hodge filtration can be expressed in coordinates using period matrices. Choose a basis δ_{1}, ..., δ_{r} for the torsion-free part of the kth integral homology group H_{k}(X, Z). Fix p and q with p + q = k, and choose a basis ω_{1}, ..., ω_{s} for the harmonic forms of type (p, q). The period matrix of X_{0} with respect to these bases is the matrix

$$\Omega = \Big(\int_{\delta_i} \omega_j\Big)_{1 \le i \le r, 1 \le j \le s}.$$

The entries of the period matrix depend on the choice of basis and on the complex structure. The δs can be varied by a choice of a matrix Λ in SL(r, Z), and the ωs can be varied by a choice of a matrix A in GL(s, C). A period matrix is equivalent to Ω if it can be written as AΩΛ for some choice of A and Λ.

== The case of elliptic curves ==
Consider the family of elliptic curves

$$y^2 = x(x - 1)(x - \lambda)$$

where λ is any complex number not equal to zero or one. The Hodge filtration on the first cohomology group of a curve has two steps, F^{0} and F^{1}. However, F^{0} is the entire cohomology group, so the only interesting term of the filtration is F^{1}, which is H^{1,0}, the space of holomorphic harmonic 1-forms.

H^{1,0} is one-dimensional because the curve is elliptic, and for all λ, it is spanned by the differential form ω = dx/y. To find explicit representatives of the homology group of the curve, note that the curve can be represented as the graph of the multivalued function

$$y = \sqrt{x(x-1)(x-\lambda)}$$

on the Riemann sphere. The branch points of this function are at zero, one, λ, and infinity. Make two branch cuts, one running from zero to one and the other running from λ to infinity. These exhaust the branch points of the function, so they cut the multi-valued function into two single-valued sheets. Fix a small ε > 0. On one of these sheets, trace the curve γ(t) = 1/2 + (1/2 + ε)exp(2πit). For ε sufficiently small, this curve surrounds the branch cut [0, 1] and does not meet the branch cut [λ, ∞]. Now trace another curve δ(t) that begins in one sheet as δ(t) = 1 + 2(λ − 1)t for 0 ≤ t ≤ 1/2 and continues in the other sheet as δ(t) = λ + 2(1 − λ)(t − 1/2) for 1/2 ≤ t ≤ 1. Each half of this curve connects the points 1 and λ on the two sheets of the Riemann surface. From the Seifert–van Kampen theorem, the homology group of the curve is free of rank two. Because the curves meet in a single point, 1 + ε, neither of their homology classes is a proper multiple of some other homology class, and hence they form a basis of H_{1}. The period matrix for this family is therefore

$$\begin{pmatrix} \int_\gamma \omega \\ \int_\delta \omega \end{pmatrix}.$$

The first entry of this matrix we will abbreviate as A, and the second as B.

The bilinear form √−1Q is positive definite because locally, we can always write ω as f dz, hence

$$\sqrt{-1}\int_{X_0} \omega \wedge \bar\omega = \sqrt{-1}\int_{X_0} |f|^2\,dz \wedge d\bar{z} > 0.$$

By Poincaré duality, γ and δ correspond to cohomology classes γ^{*} and δ^{*} which together are a basis for H^{1}(X_{0}, Z). It follows that ω can be written as a linear combination of γ^{*} and δ^{*}. The coefficients are given by evaluating ω with respect to the dual basis elements γ and δ:

$$\omega = A\gamma^* + B\delta^*.$$

When we rewrite the positive definiteness of Q in these terms, we have

$$\sqrt{-1}\int_{X_0} A\bar{B}\gamma^* \wedge \bar{\delta}^* + \bar{A}B\bar{\gamma}^* \wedge \delta^* = \int_{X_0} \operatorname{Im}\,(2\bar{A}B \bar{\gamma}^* \wedge \delta^*) > 0$$

Since γ^{*} and δ^{*} are integral, they do not change under conjugation. Furthermore, since γ and δ intersect in a single point and a single point is a generator of H_{0}, the cup product of γ^{*} and δ^{*} is the fundamental class of X_{0}. Consequently this integral equals $\operatorname{Im}\,2\bar{A}B$. The integral is strictly positive, so neither A nor B can be zero.

After rescaling ω, we may assume that the period matrix equals (1 τ) for some complex number τ with strictly positive imaginary part. This removes the ambiguity coming from the GL(1, C) action. The action of SL(2, Z) is then the usual action of the modular group on the upper half-plane. Consequently, the period domain is the Riemann sphere. This is the usual parameterization of an elliptic curve as a lattice.

== See also ==
- Hodge theory
- Jacobian variety
- Modular group
