= Lefschetz manifold =

In mathematics, a Lefschetz manifold is a particular kind of symplectic manifold $(M^{2n}, \omega)$, sharing a certain cohomological property with Kähler manifolds, that of satisfying the conclusion of the Hard Lefschetz theorem. More precisely, the strong Lefschetz property asks that for $k \in \{1, \ldots, n\}$, the cup product

$$\cup [\omega^k]\colon H^{n-k}(M, \R)\to H^{n+k}(M, \R)$$

be an isomorphism.

The topology of these symplectic manifolds is severely constrained, for example their odd Betti numbers are even. This remark leads to numerous examples of symplectic manifolds which are not Kähler, the first historical example is due to William Thurston.

== Lefschetz maps ==
Let $M$ be a ($2n$)-dimensional smooth manifold. Each element

$$[\omega] \in H_{DR}^2 (M)$$

of the second de Rham cohomology space of $M$ induces a map

$$L_{[\omega]}: H_{DR} (M) \to H_{DR} (M), [\alpha] \mapsto [\omega \wedge \alpha]$$

called the Lefschetz map of $[\omega]$. Letting $L_{[\omega]}^i$ be the $i$th iteration of $L_{[\omega]}$, we have for each $0 \leq i \leq n$ a map

$$L_{[\omega]}^i : H_{DR}^{n-i}(M) \to H_{DR}^{n+i}(M).$$

If $M$ is compact and oriented, then Poincaré duality tells us that $H_{DR}^{n-i}(M)$ and $H_{DR}^{n+i}(M)$ are vector spaces of the same dimension, so in these cases it is natural to ask whether or not the various iterations of Lefschetz maps are isomorphisms.

The Hard Lefschetz theorem states that this is the case for the symplectic form of a compact Kähler manifold.

== Definitions ==
If

$$L_{[\omega]}^{n-1}: H_{DR}^1(M) \to H_{DR}^{2n-1}$$

and

$$L_{[\omega]}^{n}: H_{DR}^0(M) \to H_{DR}^{2n}$$

are isomorphisms, then $[\omega]$ is a Lefschetz element, or Lefschetz class. If

$$L_{[\omega]}^i : H_{DR}^{n-i}(M) \to H_{DR}^{n+i}(M)$$

is an isomorphism for all $0 \leq i \leq n$, then $[\omega]$ is a strong Lefschetz element, or a strong Lefschetz class.

Let $(M,\omega)$ be a $2n$-dimensional symplectic manifold. Then it is orientable, but maybe not compact. One says that $(M,\omega)$ is a Lefschetz manifold if $[\omega]$ is a Lefschetz element, and $(M,\omega)$ is a strong Lefschetz manifold if $[\omega]$ is a strong Lefschetz element.

== Where to find Lefschetz manifolds ==
The real manifold underlying any Kähler manifold is a symplectic manifold. The strong Lefschetz theorem tells us that it is also a strong Lefschetz manifold, and hence a Lefschetz manifold. Therefore we have the following chain of inclusions.

{Kähler manifolds} $\subset$ {strong Lefschetz manifolds} $\subset${Lefschetz manifolds} $\subset$ {symplectic manifolds}

Chal Benson and Carolyn S. Gordon proved in 1988 that if a compact nilmanifold is a Lefschetz manifold, then it is diffeomorphic to a torus. The fact that there are nilmanifolds that are not diffeomorphic to a torus shows that there is some space between Kähler manifolds and symplectic manifolds, but the class of nilmanifolds fails to show any differences between Kähler manifolds, Lefschetz manifolds, and strong Lefschetz manifolds.

Gordan and Benson conjectured that if a compact complete solvmanifold admits a Kähler structure, then it is diffeomorphic to a torus. This has been proved. Furthermore, many examples have been found of solvmanifolds that are strong Lefschetz but not Kähler, and solvmanifolds that are Lefschetz but not strong Lefschetz. Such examples were given by Takumi Yamada in 2002.
