= Borel–Moore homology =

Homology theory for locally compact spaces

In topology, Borel−Moore homology or homology with closed support is a homology theory for locally compact spaces, introduced by Armand Borel and John Moore in 1960. The applications of the theory can be found largely in the fact that the theory corrects some of the imperfection found in classical homology theories. The theory is closely related to the sheaf-theoretic cohomology theory, and is essentially co-cohomology based on sheaf cohomology.

For reasonable compact spaces, Borel−Moore homology coincides with the usual singular homology. For non-compact spaces, each theory has its own advantages. In particular, a closed oriented submanifold defines a class in Borel–Moore homology, but not in ordinary homology unless the submanifold is compact. (Note: Borel equivariant cohomology is an invariant of spaces with an action of a group G; it is defined as $H^*_G(X) = H^*((EG \times X)/G).$ However, that is not related to the subject of this article.)

== Definition ==
There are several ways to define Borel−Moore homology. They all coincide for reasonable spaces such as manifolds and locally finite CW complexes.

=== Definition via sheaf cohomology ===
For any locally compact space X, Borel–Moore homology with integral coefficients is defined as the cohomology of the dual of the chain complex which computes sheaf cohomology with compact support. As a result, there is a short exact sequence analogous to the universal coefficient theorem:

$$0 \to \text{Ext}^1_{\Z}(H^{i+1}_c(X,\Z),\Z) \to H_i^{BM}(X,\Z) \to \text{Hom}(H^i_c(X,\Z),\Z) \to 0.$$

In what follows, the coefficients $\Z$ are not written.

=== Definition via locally finite chains ===
The singular homology of a topological space X is defined as the homology of the chain complex of singular chains, that is, finite linear combinations of continuous maps from the simplex to X. The Borel−Moore homology of a reasonable locally compact space X, on the other hand, is isomorphic to the homology of the chain complex of locally finite singular chains. Here "reasonable" means X is locally contractible, σ-compact, and of finite dimension.

In more detail, let $C_i^{BM}(X)$ be the abelian group of formal (infinite) sums

$$u = \sum_{\sigma} a_{\sigma } \sigma,$$

where σ runs over the set of all continuous maps from the standard i-simplex Δ^{i} to X and each a_{σ} is an integer, such that for each compact subset K of X, we have $a_\sigma\neq 0$ for only finitely many σ whose image meets K. Then the usual definition of the boundary, ∂, of a singular chain makes these abelian groups into a chain complex:

$$\cdots \to C_2^{BM}(X) \to C_1^{BM}(X) \to C_0^{BM}(X) \to 0.$$

The Borel−Moore homology groups $H_i^{BM}(X)$ are the homology groups of this chain complex. That is,

$$H^{BM}_i (X) = \ker \left (\partial : C_i^{BM}(X) \to C_{i-1}^{BM}(X) \right )/ \text{im} \left (\partial :C_{i+1}^{BM}(X) \to C_i^{BM}(X) \right ).$$

If X is compact, then every locally finite chain is in fact finite. So, given that X is "reasonable" in the sense above, Borel−Moore homology $H_i^{BM}(X)$ coincides with the usual singular homology $H_i(X)$ for X compact.

=== Definition via compactifications ===
Suppose that X is homeomorphic to the complement of a closed subcomplex S in a finite CW complex Y. Then Borel–Moore homology $H_i^{BM}(X)$ is isomorphic to the relative homology H_{i}(Y, S). Under the same assumption on X, the one-point compactification of X is homeomorphic to a finite CW complex. As a result, Borel–Moore homology can be viewed as the relative homology of the one-point compactification with respect to the added point.

=== Definition via Poincaré duality ===
Let X be any locally compact space with a closed embedding into an oriented manifold M of dimension m. Then

$$H^{BM}_i(X)= H^{m-i}(M,M\setminus X),$$

where in the right hand side, relative cohomology is meant.

=== Definition via the dualizing complex ===
For any locally compact space X of finite dimension, let D_{X} be the dualizing complex of X. Then

$$H^{BM}_i (X)=\mathbb{H}^{-i} (X, D_X),$$

where in the right hand side, hypercohomology is meant.

== Properties ==
Borel−Moore homology is a covariant functor with respect to proper maps. That is, a proper map f: X → Y induces a pushforward homomorphism $H_i^{BM}(X) \to H_i^{BM}(Y)$ for all integers i. In contrast to ordinary homology, there is no pushforward on Borel−Moore homology for an arbitrary continuous map f. As a counterexample, one can consider the non-proper inclusion $\R^2 \setminus \{0\} \to \R^2.$

Borel−Moore homology is a contravariant functor with respect to inclusions of open subsets. That is, for U open in X, there is a natural pullback or restriction homomorphism $H_i^{BM}(X) \to H_i^{BM}(U).$

For any locally compact space X and any closed subset F, with $U = X\setminus F$ the complement, there is a long exact localization sequence:
$$\cdots \to H^{BM}_i (F) \to H^{BM}_i (X) \to H^{BM}_i (U) \to H^{BM}_{i-1} (F) \to \cdots$$

Borel−Moore homology is homotopy invariant in the sense that for any space X, there is an isomorphism $H_i^{BM}(X) \to H_{i+1}^{BM}(X\times \R).$ The shift in dimension means that Borel−Moore homology is not homotopy invariant in the naive sense. For example, the Borel−Moore homology of Euclidean space $\R^n$ is isomorphic to $\Z$ in degree n and is otherwise zero.

Poincaré duality extends to non-compact manifolds using Borel–Moore homology. Namely, for an oriented n-manifold X, Poincaré duality is an isomorphism from singular cohomology to Borel−Moore homology,
$$H^i(X) \stackrel{\cong}{\to} H_{n-i}^{BM}(X)$$
for all integers i. A different version of Poincaré duality for non-compact manifolds is the isomorphism from cohomology with compact support to usual homology:
$$H^i_c(X) \stackrel{\cong}{\to} H_{n-i}(X).$$

A key advantage of Borel−Moore homology is that every oriented manifold M of dimension n (in particular, every smooth complex algebraic variety), not necessarily compact, has a fundamental class $[M] \in H_n^{BM}(M).$ If the manifold M has a triangulation, then its fundamental class is represented by the sum of all the top dimensional simplices. In fact, in Borel−Moore homology, one can define a fundamental class for arbitrary (possibly singular) complex varieties. In this case the complement of the set of smooth points $M^{\text{reg}} \subset M$ has (real) codimension at least 2, and by the long exact sequence above the top dimensional homologies of M and $M^{\text{reg}}$ are canonically isomorphic. The fundamental class of M is then defined to be the fundamental class of $M^{\text{reg}}$.

== Examples ==
=== Compact Spaces ===
Given a compact topological space $X$ its Borel-Moore homology agrees with its standard homology; that is,

$$H^{BM}_*(X) \cong H_*(X)$$

=== Real line ===
The first non-trivial calculation of Borel-Moore homology is of the real line. First observe that any $0$-chain is cohomologous to $0$. Since this reduces to the case of a point $p$, notice that we can take the Borel-Moore chain

$$\sigma = \sum_{i=0}^\infty 1\cdot [p+i,p+i+1]$$

since the boundary of this chain is $\partial\sigma = p$ and the non-existent point at infinity, the point is cohomologous to zero. Now, we can take the Borel-Moore chain

$$\sigma = \sum_{-\infty<k<\infty} [k, k+1]$$

which has no boundary, hence is a homology class. This shows that

$$H_k^{BM}(\R) = \begin{cases} \Z & k = 1 \\ 0 & \text{otherwise} \end{cases}$$

=== Real n-space ===
The previous computation can be generalized to the case $\R^n.$ We get

$$H_k^{BM}(\R^n) = \begin{cases} \Z & k = n \\ 0 & \text{otherwise} \end{cases}$$

=== Infinite Cylinder ===
Using the Künneth decomposition, we can see that the infinite cylinder $S^1\times\R$ has homology

$$H_k^{BM}(S^1\times \R ) = \begin{cases}
\Z & k = 1 \\
\Z & k = 2 \\
0 & \text{otherwise}
\end{cases}$$

=== Real n-space minus a point ===
Using the long exact sequence in Borel-Moore homology, we get (for $n>1$) the non-zero exact sequences

$$0 \to H_n^{BM}(\{0\}) \to H_n^{BM}(\R ^n) \to H_n^{BM}(\R ^n-\{0\}) \to 0$$

and

$$0 \to H_1^{BM}(\R ^n-\{0\}) \to H_0^{BM}(\{0\}) \to H_0^{BM}(\R ^n) \to H_0^{BM}(\R ^n-\{0\}) \to 0$$

From the first sequence we get that

$$H_n^{BM}(\R ^n) \cong H_n^{BM}(\R ^n-\{0\})$$

and from the second we get that

$$H_1^{BM}(\R ^n-\{0\}) \cong H_0^{BM}(\{0\})$$
and

$$0 \cong H_0^{BM}(\R ^n) \cong H_0^{BM}(\R ^n-\{0\})$$

We can interpret these non-zero homology classes using the following observations:

1. There is the homotopy equivalence $\R ^n-\{0\} \simeq S^{n-1}.$
2. A topological isomorphism $\R ^n-\{0\} \cong S^{n-1} \times \R _{>0}.$

hence we can use the computation for the infinite cylinder to interpret $H_n^{BM}$ as the homology class represented by $S^{n-1}\times\R _{>0}$ and $H_1^{BM}$ as $\R _{>0}.$

=== Plane with Points Removed ===
Let $X = \R^2 - \{p_1,\ldots, p_k \}$ have $k$-distinct points removed. Notice the previous computation with the fact that Borel-Moore homology is an isomorphism invariant gives this computation for the case $k = 1$. In general, we will find a $1$-class corresponding to a loop around a point, and the fundamental class $[X]$ in $H_2^{BM}$.

=== Double Cone ===
Consider the double cone $X = \mathbb{V}(x^2 + y^2 - z^2) \subset \R ^3$. If we take $U = X \setminus \{0\}$ then the long exact sequence shows

$$\begin{align}
H_2^{BM}(X) &= \Z^{\oplus 2} \\
H_1^{BM}(X) &= \Z \\
H_k^{BM}(X) &= 0 && \text{ for } k \not\in \{1,2\}
\end{align}$$

=== Genus Two Curve with Three Points Removed ===
Given a genus two curve (Riemann surface) $X$ and three points $F$, we can use the long exact sequence to compute the Borel-Moore homology of $U = X \setminus F.$ This gives

$$\begin{align}
H_2^{BM}(F) \to & H_2^{BM}(X) \to H_2^{BM}(U)     \\
\to H_1^{BM}(F) \to & H_1^{BM}(X) \to H_1^{BM}(U)     \\
\to H_0^{BM}(F) \to & H_0^{BM}(X) \to H_0^{BM}(U) \to  0
\end{align}$$

Since $F$ is only three points we have

$$H_1^{BM}(F) = H_2^{BM}(F) =0.$$

This gives us that $H_2^{BM}(U) = \Z.$ Using Poincare-duality we can compute

$$H_0^{BM}(U) = H^2(U) = 0,$$

since $U$ deformation retracts to a one-dimensional CW-complex. Finally, using the computation for the homology of a compact genus 2 curve we are left with the exact sequence

$$0 \to \Z ^{\oplus 4} \to H_1^{BM}(U) \to \Z ^{\oplus 3} \to \Z \to 0$$

showing

$$H_1^{BM}(U) \cong \Z ^{\oplus 6}$$

since we have the short exact sequence of free abelian groups

$$0 \to \Z ^{\oplus 4} \to H_1^{BM}(U) \to \Z ^{\oplus 2} \to 0$$

from the previous sequence.
