= Hyperhomology =

Generalization of (co)homology using chain complexes

In homological algebra, the hyperhomology or hypercohomology ($\mathbb{H}_*(-), \mathbb{H}^*(-)$) is a generalization of (co)homology functors which takes as input not objects in an abelian category $\mathcal{A}$ but instead chain complexes of objects, so objects in $\text{Ch}(\mathcal{A})$. It is a sort of cross between the derived functor cohomology of an object and the homology of a chain complex since hypercohomology corresponds to the derived global sections functor $\mathbf{R}^*\Gamma(-)$.

Hyperhomology is no longer used much: since about 1970 it has been largely replaced by the roughly equivalent concept of a derived functor between derived categories.

== Motivation ==
One of the motivations for hypercohomology comes from the fact that there is no obvious generalization of cohomological long exact sequences associated to short exact sequences

$0 \to M' \to M \to M'' \to 0$

i.e. there is an associated long exact sequence

$0 \to H^0(M') \to H^0(M) \to H^0(M'')\to H^1(M') \to \cdots$

It turns out that hypercohomology gives techniques for constructing a similar cohomological associated long exact sequence from an arbitrary long exact sequence since its inputs are given by chain complexes instead of just objects from an abelian category.

$0 \to M_1 \to M_2\to \cdots \to M_k \to 0$

We can turn this chain complex into a distinguished triangle (using the language of triangulated categories on a derived category)

$M_1 \to [M_2 \to \cdots \to M_{k-1}] \to M_k[-k+3] \xrightarrow{+1}$

which we denote by

$\mathcal{M}'_\bullet \to \mathcal{M}_\bullet \to \mathcal{M}''_\bullet \xrightarrow{+1}$

Then, taking derived global sections $\mathbf{R}^*\Gamma(-)$ gives a long exact sequence, which is a long exact sequence of hypercohomology groups.

== Definition ==
We give the definition for hypercohomology as this is more common. As usual, hypercohomology and hyperhomology are essentially the same: one converts from one to the other by dualizing, i.e. by changing the direction of all arrows, replacing injective objects with projective ones, and so on.

Suppose that A is an abelian category with enough injectives and F a left exact functor to another abelian category B. If C is a complex of objects of A bounded on the left, the hypercohomology

H^{i}(C)

of C (for an integer i) is calculated as follows:

1. Take a quasi-isomorphism Φ : C → I, here I is a complex of injective elements of A.
2. The hypercohomology H^{i}(C) of C is then the cohomology H^{i}(F(I)) of the complex F(I).

The hypercohomology of C is independent of the choice of the quasi-isomorphism, up to unique isomorphisms.

The hypercohomology can also be defined using derived categories: the hypercohomology of C is just the cohomology of RF(C) considered as an element of the derived category of B.

For complexes that vanish for negative indices, the hypercohomology can be defined as the derived functors of H^{0} = FH^{0} = H^{0}F.

== The hypercohomology spectral sequences ==
There are two hypercohomology spectral sequences; one with E_{2} term

$$R^iF(H^j(C))$$

and the other with E_{1} term

$$R^jF(C^i)$$

and E_{2} term

$$H^i(R^jF(C))$$

both converging to the hypercohomology

$$H^{i+j}(RF(C))$$,

where R^{j}F is a right derived functor of F.

=== Applications ===
One application of hypercohomology spectral sequences are in the study of gerbes. Recall that rank n vector bundles on a space $X$ can be classified as the Čech cohomology group $H^1(X,\underline{GL}_n)$. The main idea behind gerbes is to extend this idea cohomologically, so instead of taking $H^1(X,\textbf{R}^0F)$ for some functor $F$, we instead consider the cohomology group $H^1(X,\textbf{R}^1F)$, so it classifies objects which are glued by objects in the original classifying group. A closely related subject which studies gerbes and hypercohomology is Deligne cohomology.

== Examples ==
- For a variety X over a field k, the second spectral sequence from above gives the Hodge–de Rham spectral sequence for algebraic de Rham cohomology:
  $$E_1^{p,q}=H^q(X,\Omega_X^p)\Rightarrow \mathbf{H}^{p+q}(X,\Omega_X^{\bullet})=:H_{DR}^{p+q}(X/k)$$.
- Another example comes from the holomorphic log complex on a complex manifold. Let X be a complex algebraic manifold and $j: X\hookrightarrow Y$ a good compactification. This means that Y is a compact algebraic manifold and $D = Y-X$ is a divisor on $Y$ with simple normal crossings. The natural inclusion of complexes of sheaves
  $$\Omega^{\bullet}_Y(\log D)\rightarrow j_*\Omega_{X}^{\bullet}$$
  turns out to be a quasi-isomorphism and induces an isomorphism
  $$H^k(X;\mathbb{C})\rightarrow \mathbf{H}^k(Y, \Omega^{\bullet}_Y(\log D))$$.

== See also ==
- Cartan–Eilenberg resolution
- Gerbe
