= Normal crossing singularity =

Singularities of algebraic varieties

In algebraic geometry, a normal crossing singularity looks locally like a union of coordinate hyperplanes. There are two variants of the concept, a divisor with normal crossings or with simple normal crossings. These can be considered the simplest kind of singularities. Several theorems on resolution of singularities relate an arbitrary variety to a divisor with simple normal crossings in a smooth variety.

== Divisor with simple normal crossings ==
Let X be an algebraic variety over a perfect field k. (The same definition applies to a complex manifold X.) Let D be a finite set of closed subvarieties of X (understood to be irreducible), written formally as a sum, $D=\sum_{j=1}^r D_j$. For some purposes, one may identify D with the closed subset $\cup_j D_j$ of X. Then D is a divisor with simple normal crossings (or an snc divisor) in X if

- X is smooth over k,
- each $D_j$ is smooth and of codimension 1 in X, and
- the varieties $D_j$ intersect transversely in X. That is, at a point p that lies on s of the varieties $D_j$, the intersection of the tangent spaces of those $D_j$'s at p has codimension s in the tangent space of X at p.

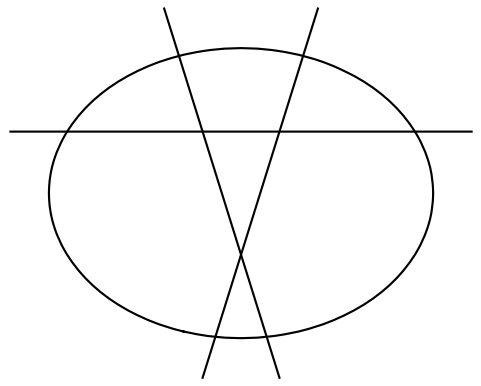
A divisor with simple normal crossings in the affine plane

The transversality condition can be rephrased in several ways. Over the complex numbers, it is equivalent to say that at a complex point p that lies on s of the subvarieties, say $D_1,\ldots,D_s$, there is a complex analytic coordinate chart around p in which p is the origin in $\mathbb{C}^n=\{(z_1,\ldots,z_n): z_j\in \mathbb{C}\text{ for each }j \}$ and $D_j$ is the coordinate hyperplane $\{ z_j=0 \}$, for $j=1,\ldots,s$. In the language of schemes, transversality means that the scheme-theoretic intersection of any s of the $D_j$'s is smooth of codimension s in X (or empty).

Outside the setting of varieties over a perfect field, the following more general definition is used. Let X be a scheme, $D=\sum_j D_j$ a formal sum of integral closed subschemes. For each point p in X, let $O_{X,p}$ be the local ring of X at p (the ring of regular functions near p), with maximal ideal $\mathfrak{m}$ (the functions vanishing at p) and residue field $k(p)$. Say that functions $z_1,\ldots,z_n$ in $\mathfrak{m}$ form local coordinates at p if they map to a basis for the $k(p)$-vector space $\mathfrak{m}/\mathfrak{m}^2$. Then D is a divisor with simple normal crossings in X if X is regular and for each point p in X, there are local coordinates $z_1,\ldots,z_n$ at p for which each $D_j$ that contains p is equal to the closed subscheme $\{ z_{i(j)}=0 \}$ near p for some $i(j)$.

There is a more general notion of a divisor, meaning a formal sum of codimension-1 subvarieties with integer coefficients, $D=\sum_{j=1}^r a_j D_j$. A divisor D is said to have simple normal crossings in X if the associated "reduced" divisor $\sum_{j=1}^r D_j$ has simple normal crossings in X.

== Resolution of singularities ==
Although a divisor with simple normal crossings is very special, the concept can be used to study arbitrary varieties using Heisuke Hironaka's theorems on resolution of singularities. One result is: let X be a variety over a field of characteristic zero, and let S be a Zariski closed subset that contains the singular locus of X and is not all of X. (The case where S is equal to the singular locus is already important.) Then there is a proper birational morphism f from a smooth variety Y to X such that f is an isomorphism over X – S and the inverse image of S is a divisor with simple normal crossings in Y. This is an optimal statement; one cannot always make the inverse image of S smooth, for example.

Alexander Grothendieck conjectured that the same thing (in terms of regular schemes rather than smooth varieties) should be true for algebraic varieties over any field, and even more generally, for quasi-excellent schemes.

== Divisor with normal crossings ==
More generally, $D=\sum_j D_j$ is a divisor with normal crossings in a scheme X if X is regular and for every point p in X, there is an étale morphism $X'\to X$ with p in the image such that the inverse image of D is a divisor with simple normal crossings in $X'$. When X is a variety over a perfect field k, it is equivalent to say that the inclusion of D into X is étale-locally isomorphic to a union of coordinate hyperplanes in affine space $A^n_k$. A divisor with normal crossings has simple normal crossings if and only if each irreducible component of D is regular.

== Examples ==
- The closed subset $\{ xy=0 \}$ in the affine plane $A^2$ over a field, viewed as a divisor, has simple normal crossings. This is the union of the two coordinate axes.
- The nodal cubic curve $D=\{ y^2=x^2(x+1) \}$ is a divisor with normal crossings in the affine plane, but it does not have simple normal crossings. (Simple normal crossings would imply that each irreducible component of D is regular, whereas in this case D is irreducible and singular.)
- The cuspidal cubic curve $D=\{ y^2=x^3 \}$ in the affine plane does not have normal crossings.
- The divisor $\{ (y+x^2)(y-x^2)=0 \}$ in the affine plane, say over $\mathbb{C}$, does not have normal crossings. (The two irreducible components are smooth, but they do not intersect transversely.)
- The divisor $\{ yx(y-x)=0 \}$ in the affine plane does not have normal crossings. (Each of the three irreducible components is smooth, and any two of them intersect transversely, but the three together are not transverse. Transversality would imply that the intersection of more than n components in an n-dimensional variety is empty.)

== Normal crossing scheme ==
A scheme Y is said to be snc or to have simple normal crossings if every point has a Zariski open neighborhood which is isomorphic to a divisor with simple normal crossings (viewed as a reduced closed subscheme) in some regular scheme. Thus Y need not be given (globally) as a closed subscheme of a regular scheme. Likewise, a scheme Y has normal crossings if every point has an étale neighborhood $Y'\to Y$ such that $Y'$ is isomorphic to a divisor with simple normal crossings in some regular scheme. For example, stable curves are normal crossing schemes of dimension 1.
