= Čech-to-derived functor spectral sequence =

In algebraic topology, a branch of mathematics, the Čech-to-derived functor spectral sequence is a spectral sequence that relates Čech cohomology of a sheaf and sheaf cohomology.

== Definition ==
Let $\mathcal{F}$ be a sheaf on a topological space X. Choose an open cover $\mathfrak{U}$ of X. That is, $\mathfrak{U}$ is a set of open subsets of X which together cover X. Let $\mathcal{H}^q(X, \mathcal{F})$ denote the presheaf which takes an open set U to the qth cohomology of $\mathcal{F}$ on U, that is, to $H^q(U, \mathcal{F})$. For any presheaf $\mathcal{G}$, let $\check{H}^p(\mathfrak{U}, \mathcal{G})$ denote the pth Čech cohomology of $\mathcal{G}$ with respect to the cover $\mathfrak{U}$. Then the Čech-to-derived functor spectral sequence is:

$$E^{p,q}_2 = \check{H}^p(\mathfrak{U}, \mathcal{H}^q(X, \mathcal{F})) \Rightarrow H^{p+q}(X, \mathcal{F}).$$

== Properties ==
If $\mathfrak{U}$ consists of only two open sets, then this spectral sequence degenerates to the Mayer–Vietoris sequence. See Spectral sequence#Long exact sequences.

If for all finite intersections of a covering the cohomology vanishes, the E_{2}-term degenerates and the edge morphisms yield an isomorphism of Čech cohomology for this covering to sheaf cohomology. This provides a method of computing sheaf cohomology using Čech cohomology. For instance, this happens if $\mathcal{F}$ is a quasi-coherent sheaf on a scheme and each element of $\mathfrak{U}$ is an open affine subscheme such that all finite intersections are again affine (e.g. if the scheme is separated). This can be used to compute the cohomology of line bundles on projective space.

== See also ==
- Leray's theorem
