= Nicole De Grande-De Kimpe =

Belgian mathematician (1936–2008)

Nicole Leonie Jean Marie De Grande-De Kimpe (7 September 1936 – 23 July 2008) was a Belgian mathematician known as a pioneer of p-adic functional analysis, and particularly for her work on locally convex topological vector spaces over fields with non-Archimedean valuations.

== Early life and education ==
De Grande-De Kimpe was born on 7 September 1936 in Antwerp, the only child of a dockworker living in Hoboken, Antwerp, where she grew up, went to high school, and learned to play the violin. She studied mathematics on a scholarship to Ghent University, finished her degree with a specialty in mathematical analysis there in 1958, and took a job as a high school mathematics teacher.

In 1963, she began a research fellowship, funded by the National Center for Algebra and Topology, which she used to study under Guy Hirsch at the Free University of Brussels. Following that, from 1965 to 1970 she worked as a graduate assistant in analysis for Piet Wuyts at the Free University of Brussels. During this time, she married, had a daughter, and divorced. She completed her Ph.D. in 1970, supervised by Hans Freudenthal at Utrecht University.

== Later life and career ==
After a year of postdoctoral research with Freudenthal at Utrecht, De Grande-De Kimpe took a position in 1971 at the Vrije Universiteit Brussel, the Flemish half of the newly-split Free University of Brussels.

There, she and Lucien Van Hamme organized a long-running seminar on $p$-adic analysis beginning in 1978, and hosted an international conference on the subject in 1986. Recognizing that there was enough critical mass for a more specialized international conference on $p$-adic functional analysis, De Grande-De Kimpe founded the series of International Conferences on $p$-adic Functional Analysis, with cofounders Javier Martínez Maurica and José Manuel Bayod, beginning with the first conference in 1990 in Spain. She also served a term as head of the mathematics department at her university.

After retiring to her home in Willebroek in 2001, she remained mathematically active and continued to teach the history of mathematics. She died on 23 July 2008.

== Recognition ==
In 2002, a festschrift was published as a special volume of the Bulletin of the Belgian Mathematical Society, Simon Stevin, honoring both De Grande-De Kimpe and Lucien Van Hamme, who retired at the same time. The 11th International Conference on $p$-adic Functional Analysis, held in 2010, was dedicated to the memory of De Grande-De Kimpe.
