= Serre spectral sequence =

Spectral sequence in algebraic topology

In mathematics, the Serre spectral sequence (sometimes Leray–Serre spectral sequence to acknowledge earlier work of Jean Leray in the Leray spectral sequence) is an important tool in algebraic topology. It expresses, in the language of homological algebra, the singular (co)homology of the total space X of a (Serre) fibration in terms of the (co)homology of the base space B and the fiber F. The result is due to Jean-Pierre Serre in his doctoral dissertation.

== Cohomology spectral sequence ==
Let $f\colon X\to B$ be a Serre fibration of topological spaces, and let F be the (path-connected) fiber. The Serre cohomology spectral sequence is the following:

$$E_2^{p,q} = H^p(B, H^q(F)) \Rightarrow H^{p+q}(X).$$

Here, at least under standard simplifying conditions, the coefficient group in the $E_2$-term is the q-th integral cohomology group of F, and the outer group is the singular cohomology of B with coefficients in that group. The differential on the kth page is $d_k:E_k^{p,q}\to E_k^{p+k,q+1-k}$.

Strictly speaking, what is meant is cohomology with respect to the local coefficient system on B given by the cohomology of the various fibers. Assuming for example, that B is simply connected, this collapses to the usual cohomology. For a path connected base, all the different fibers are homotopy equivalent. In particular, their cohomology is isomorphic, so the choice of "the" fiber does not give any ambiguity.

The abutment means integral cohomology of the total space X.

This spectral sequence can be derived from an exact couple built out of the long exact sequences of the cohomology of the pair $(X_p, X_{p-1})$, where $X_p$ is the restriction of the fibration over the p-skeleton of B. More precisely, using this notation,

$A = \bigoplus_{p,q} H^q(X_p),$ $E_1^{p,q} = C = \bigoplus_{p,q} H^q(X_p, X_{p-1}),$

f is defined by restricting each piece on $X_p$ to $X_{p-1}$, g is defined using the coboundary map in the long exact sequence of the pair, and h is defined by restricting $(X_p, X_{p-1})$ to $X_p.$

There is a multiplicative structure

$$E_r^{p,q} \times E_r^{s,t} \to E_r^{p+s,q+t},$$

coinciding on the E_{2}-term with (−1)^{qs} times the cup product, and with respect to which the differentials $d_{r}$ are (graded) derivations inducing the product on the $E_{r+1}$-page from the one on the $E_r$-page.

== Homology spectral sequence ==
Similarly to the cohomology spectral sequence, there is one for homology:

$$E^2_{p,q} = H_p(B, H_q(F)) \Rightarrow H_{p+q}(X).$$

where the notations are dual to the ones above, in particular the differential on the kth page is a map $d_k:E^k_{p,q}\to E^k_{p-k,q-1+k}$.

== Example computations ==
=== Hopf fibration ===
Recall that the Hopf fibration is given by $S^1 \hookrightarrow S^3 \to S^2$. The $E_2$-page of the Leray–Serre Spectral sequence reads

$$\begin{array}{c|ccc}
1 & H^0(S^2;\Z ) & 0 & H^2(S^2;\Z ) \\
0 & H^0(S^2;\Z ) & 0 & H^2(S^2;\Z ) \\
\hline & 0 & 1 & 2
\end{array}$$

The differential $d_{2+i}$ goes $1+i$ down and $2+i$ right. Thus the only differential which is not necessarily 0 is d^{0,1}_{2}, because the rest have domain or codomain 0 (since they are 0 on the E_{2}-page). In particular, this sequence degenerates at E_{2} = E_{∞}. The E_{3}-page reads

$$\begin{array}{c|ccc}
1 & \ker d_2^{0,1} & 0 & H^2(S^2;\Z) \\
0 & H^0(S^2;\Z ) & 0 & \operatorname{coker} d_2^{0,1} \\
\hline & 0 & 1 & 2
\end{array}$$

The spectral sequence abuts to $H^{p+q}(S^3),$ i.e. $E_3^{p,q} = Gr^pH^{p+q}(S^3).$ Evaluating at the interesting parts, we have $\ker d_2^{0,1} = Gr^1H^1(S^3)$ and $\operatorname{coker} d_2^{0,1} = Gr^0 H^2(S^3).$ Knowing the cohomology of $S^3,$ both are zero, so the differential $d_2^{0,1}$ is an isomorphism.

=== Sphere bundle on a complex projective variety ===
Given a complex n-dimensional projective variety X there is a canonical family of line bundles $\mathcal{O}_X(k)$ for $k\in \Z$ coming from the embedding $X \to \mathbb{CP}^m$. This is given by the global sections $s_0,\ldots,s_m \in \Gamma(X,\mathcal{O}_X(1))$ which send

$$x \mapsto [s_0(x):\ldots : s_m(x)]$$

If we construct a rank r vector bundle $\mathcal{E}$ which is a finite Whitney sum of vector bundles we can construct a sphere bundle $S \to X$ whose fibers are the spheres $S^{2r-1} \subset \Complex^r$. Then, we can use the Serre spectral sequence along with the Euler class to compute the integral cohomology of S. The $E_2$-page is given by $E_2^{p,q} = H^p(X;H^q(S^{2r-1}))$. We see that the only non-trivial differentials are given on the $E_{2r}$-page and are defined by cupping with the Euler class $e(\mathcal{E})$. In this case it is given by the top chern class of $\mathcal{E}$. For example, consider the vector bundle $\mathcal{O}_X(a)\oplus\mathcal{O}_X(b)$ for X a K3 surface. Then, the spectral sequence reads as

$$E_2 = E_3 = E_4 = \begin{array}{c|ccccc}
3 & H^0(X;\Z ) & H^1(X;\Z ) & H^2(X;\Z ) & H^3(X;\Z ) & H^4(X;\Z ) \\
2 & 0 & 0 & 0 & 0 & 0 \\
1 & 0 & 0 & 0 & 0 & 0 \\
0 & H^0(X;\Z ) & H^1(X;\Z ) & H^2(X;\Z ) & H^3(X;\Z ) & H^4(X;\Z ) \\
\hline & 0 & 1 & 2 & 3 & 4
\end{array}$$

The differential $d_4 = \cup a\cdot b H^2$ for $H^2$ is the square of the Lefschetz class. In this case, the only non-trivial differential is then

$$d_4^{0,3}: H^0(X;\Z ) \to H^4(X;\Z )$$

We can finish this computation by noting the only nontrivial cohomology groups are

$$H^k(X;\Z ) = \begin{cases}
\Z  & k \in \{0 , 4 \} \\
\Z^{\oplus 22} & k = 2
\end{cases}$$

=== Basic pathspace fibration ===
We begin first with a basic example; consider the path space fibration

$$\Omega S^{n+1}\to PS^{n+1}\to S^{n+1}.$$

We know the homology of the base and total space, so our intuition tells us that the Serre spectral sequence should be able to tell us the homology of the loop space. This is an example of a case where we can study the homology of a fibration by using the E^{∞} page (the homology of the total space) to control what can happen on the E^{2} page. So recall that

$$E^2_{p,q} = H_p(S^{n+1}; H_q(\Omega S^{n+1})).$$

Thus we know when q = 0, we are just looking at the regular integer valued homology groups H_{p}(S^{n+1}) which has value $\Z$ in degrees 0 and n+1 and value 0 everywhere else. However, since the path space is contractible, we know that by the time the sequence gets to E^{∞}, everything becomes 0 except for the group at p = q = 0. The only way this can happen is if there is an isomorphism from $H_{n+1}(S^{n+1}; H_0(F))=\Z$ to another group. However, the only places a group can be nonzero are in the columns p = 0 or p = n+1 so this isomorphism must occur on the page E^{n+1} with codomain $H_0(S^{n+1};H_n(F))=\Z.$ However, putting a $\Z$ in this group means there must be a $\Z$ at H_{n+1}(S^{n+1}; H_{n}(F)). Inductively repeating this process shows that H_{i}(ΩS^{n+1}) has value $\Z$ at integer multiples of n and 0 everywhere else.

=== Cohomology ring of complex projective space ===
We compute the cohomology of $\mathbb{CP}^n$ using the fibration:

$$S^1\hookrightarrow S^{2n+1}\to \mathbb{CP}^n$$

Now, on the E_{2} page, in the 0,0 coordinate we have the identity of the ring. In the 0,1 coordinate, we have an element i that generates $\Z.$ However, we know that by the limit page, there can only be nontrivial generators in degree 2n+1 telling us that the generator i must transgress to some element x in the 2,0 coordinate. Now, this tells us that there must be an element ix in the 2,1 coordinate. We then see that d(ix) = x^{2} by the Leibniz rule telling us that the 4,0 coordinate must be x^{2} since there can be no nontrivial homology until degree 2n+1. Repeating this argument inductively until 2n + 1 gives ix^{n} in coordinate 2n,1 which must then be the only generator of $\Z$ in that degree thus telling us that the 2n + 1,0 coordinate must be 0. Reading off the horizontal bottom row of the spectral sequence gives us the cohomology ring of $\mathbb{CP}^n$ and it tells us that the answer is $\Z[x]/x^{n+1}.$

In the case of infinite complex projective space, taking limits gives the answer $\Z[x].$

=== Fourth homotopy group of the three-sphere ===
A more sophisticated application of the Serre spectral sequence is the computation $\pi_4(S^3) =\Z/2\Z.$ This particular example illustrates a systematic technique which one can use in order to deduce information about the higher homotopy groups of spheres. Consider the following fibration which is an isomorphism on $\pi_3$

$$X\to S^3\to K(\Z,3),$$

where $K(\pi, n)$ is an Eilenberg–MacLane space. We then further convert the map $X \to S^3$ to a fibration; it is general knowledge that the iterated fiber is the loop space of the base space so in our example we get that the fiber is $\Omega K(\Z,3) = K(\Z,2).$ But we know that $K(\Z,2) = \mathbb{CP}^{\infty}.$ Now we look at the cohomological Serre spectral sequence: we suppose we have a generator for the degree 3 cohomology of $S^3$, called $\iota$. Since there is nothing in degree 3 in the total cohomology, we know this must be killed by an isomorphism. But the only element that can map to it is the generator a of the cohomology ring of $\mathbb{CP}^{\infty}$, so we have $d(a) = \iota$. Therefore by the cup product structure, the generator in degree 4, $a^2$, maps to the generator $\iota a$ by multiplication by 2 and that the generator of cohomology in degree 6 maps to $\iota a^2$ by multiplication by 3, etc. In particular we find that $H_4(X) =\Z/2\Z.$ But now since we killed off the lower homotopy groups of X (i.e., the groups in degrees less than 4) by using the iterated fibration, we know that $H_4(X) = \pi_4(X)$ by the Hurewicz theorem, telling us that $\pi_4(S^3) =\Z/2\Z.$

Corollary: $\pi_4(S^2) =\Z/2\Z.$

Proof: Take the long exact sequence of homotopy groups for the Hopf fibration $S^1\to S^3\to S^2$.

== See also ==
- Gysin sequence
