= Good cover =

Open topological cover

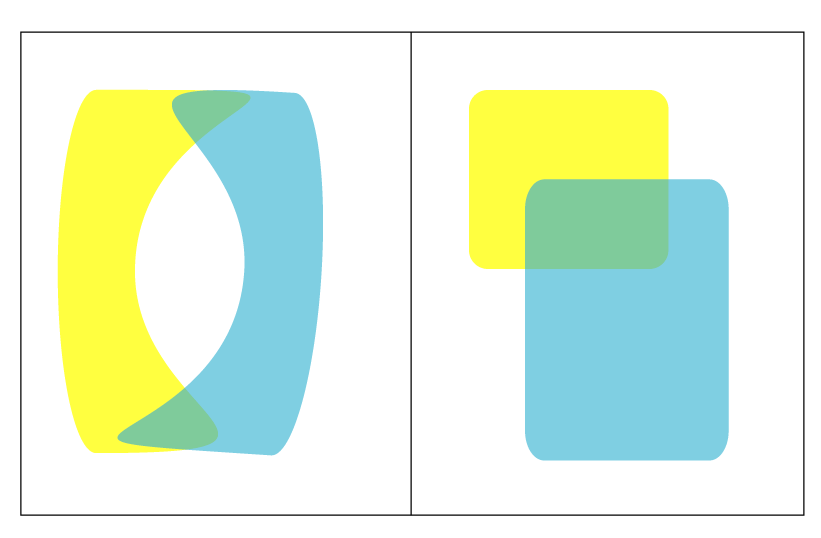
The cover on the left is not a good cover, since while all open sets in the cover are contractible, their intersection is disconnected. The cover on the right is a good cover, since the intersection of the two sets is contractible.

In mathematics, an open cover of a topological space $X$ is a family of open subsets such that $X$ is the union of all of the open sets. A good cover is an open cover in which all sets and all non-empty intersections of finitely-many sets are contractible (Petersen 2006).

The concept was introduced by André Weil in 1952 for differentiable manifolds, demanding the $U_{\alpha_1 \ldots \alpha_n}$ to be differentiably contractible. A modern version of this definition appears in Bott & Tu (1982).

== Application ==
A major reason for the notion of a good cover is that the Leray spectral sequence of a fiber bundle degenerates for a good cover, and so the Čech cohomology associated with a good cover is the same as the Čech cohomology of the space. (Such a cover is known as a Leray cover.) However, for the purposes of computing the Čech cohomology it suffices to have a more relaxed definition of a good cover in which all intersections of finitely many open sets have contractible connected components. This follows from the fact that higher derived functors can be computed using acyclic resolutions.

== Example ==
The two-dimensional surface of a sphere $S^2$ has an open cover by two contractible sets, open neighborhoods of opposite hemispheres. However these two sets have an intersection that forms a non-contractible equatorial band. To form a good cover for this surface, one needs at least four open sets. A good cover can be formed by projecting the faces of a tetrahedron onto a sphere in which it is inscribed, and taking an open neighborhood of each face. The more relaxed definition of a good cover allows us to do this using only three open sets. A cover can be formed by choosing two diametrically opposite points on the sphere, drawing three non-intersecting segments lying on the sphere connecting them and taking open neighborhoods of the resulting faces.
