= Leray–Hirsch theorem =

Relates the homology of a fiber bundle with the homologies of its base and fiber

In mathematics, the Leray–Hirsch theorem is a basic result on the algebraic topology of fiber bundles. It is named after Jean Leray and Guy Hirsch, who independently proved it in the late 1940s. It can be thought of as a mild generalization of the Künneth formula, which computes the cohomology of a product space as a tensor product of the cohomologies of the direct factors. It is a very special case of the Leray spectral sequence.

== Statement ==
=== Setup ===
Let $\pi\colon E\longrightarrow B$ be a fibre bundle with fibre $F$. Assume that for each degree $p$, the singular cohomology rational vector space

$$H^p(F) = H^p(F; \mathbb{Q})$$

is finite-dimensional, and that the inclusion

$$\iota\colon F \longrightarrow E$$

induces a surjection in rational cohomology

$$\iota^* \colon H^*(E) \longrightarrow H^*(F)$$.

Consider a section of this surjection

$$s\colon H^*(F) \longrightarrow H^*(E)$$,

by definition, this map satisfies

$$\iota^* \circ s = \mathrm {Id}$$.

=== The Leray–Hirsch isomorphism ===
The Leray–Hirsch theorem states that the linear map

$$\begin{array}{ccc}
H^* (F)\otimes H^*(B) & \longrightarrow & H^* (E) \\
\alpha \otimes \beta & \longmapsto & s (\alpha)\smallsmile \pi^*(\beta)
\end{array}$$

is an isomorphism of $H^*(B)$-modules.

=== Statement in coordinates ===
In other words, if for every $p$, there exist classes

$$c_{1,p},\ldots,c_{m_p,p} \in H^p(E)$$

that restrict, on each fiber $F$, to a basis of the cohomology in degree $p$, the map given below is then an isomorphism of $H^*(B)$ modules.

$$\begin{array}{ccc}
H^*(F)\otimes H^*(B) & \longrightarrow & H^*(E) \\
\sum_{i,j,k}a_{i,j,k}\iota^*(c_{i,j})\otimes b_k & \longmapsto & \sum_{i,j,k}a_{i,j,k}c_{i,j}\wedge\pi^*(b_k)
\end{array}$$

where $\{b_k\}$ is a basis for $H^*(B)$ and thus, induces a basis $\{\iota^*(c_{i,j})\otimes b_k\}$ for $H^*(F)\otimes H^*(B).$
