= Grothendieck spectral sequence =

Spectral sequence

In mathematics, in the field of homological algebra, the Grothendieck spectral sequence, introduced by Alexander Grothendieck in his Tôhoku paper, is a spectral sequence that computes the derived functors of the composition of two functors $G\circ F$, from knowledge of the derived functors of $F$ and $G$. Many spectral sequences in algebraic geometry are instances of the Grothendieck spectral sequence, for example the Leray spectral sequence.

== Statement ==
If $F \colon\mathcal{A}\to\mathcal{B}$ and $G \colon \mathcal{B}\to\mathcal{C}$ are two additive and left exact functors between abelian categories such that both $\mathcal{A}$ and $\mathcal{B}$ have enough injectives and $F$ takes injective objects to $G$-acyclic objects, then for each object $A$ of $\mathcal{A}$ there is a spectral sequence:

$$E_2^{pq} = ({\rm R}^p G \circ{\rm R}^q F)(A) \Longrightarrow {\rm R}^{p+q} (G\circ F)(A),$$

where ${\rm R}^p G$ denotes the p-th right-derived functor of $G$, etc., and where the arrow '$\Longrightarrow$' means convergence of spectral sequences.

=== Five term exact sequence ===
The exact sequence of low degrees reads

$$0\to {\rm R}^1G(FA)\to {\rm R}^1(GF)(A) \to G({\rm R}^1F(A)) \to {\rm R}^2G(FA) \to {\rm R}^2(GF)(A).$$

== Examples ==
=== The Leray spectral sequence ===
If $X$ and $Y$ are topological spaces, let $\mathcal{A} = \mathbf{Ab}(X)$ and $\mathcal{B} = \mathbf{Ab}(Y)$ be the category of sheaves of abelian groups on $X$ and $Y$, respectively.

For a continuous map $f \colon X \to Y$ there is the (left-exact) direct image functor $f_* \colon \mathbf{Ab}(X) \to \mathbf{Ab}(Y)$. We also have the global section functors

$\Gamma_X \colon \mathbf{Ab}(X)\to \mathbf{Ab}$ and $\Gamma_Y \colon \mathbf{Ab}(Y) \to \mathbf {Ab}.$

Then since $\Gamma_Y \circ f_* = \Gamma_X$ and the functors $f_*$ and $\Gamma_Y$ satisfy the hypotheses (since the direct image functor has an exact left adjoint $f^{-1}$, pushforwards of injectives are injective and in particular acyclic for the global section functor), the sequence in this case becomes:

$$H^p(Y,{\rm R}^q f_*\mathcal{F})\implies H^{p+q}(X,\mathcal{F})$$

for a sheaf $\mathcal{F}$ of abelian groups on $X$.

=== Local-to-global Ext spectral sequence ===
There is a spectral sequence relating the global Ext and the sheaf Ext: let F, G be sheaves of modules over a ringed space $(X, \mathcal{O})$; e.g., a scheme. Then

$E^{p,q}_2 = \operatorname{H}^p(X; \mathcal{E}xt^q_{\mathcal{O}}(F, G)) \Rightarrow \operatorname{Ext}^{p+q}_{\mathcal{O}}(F, G).$

This is an instance of the Grothendieck spectral sequence: indeed,

$R^p \Gamma(X, -) = \operatorname{H}^p(X, -)$, $R^q \mathcal{H}om_{\mathcal{O}}(F, -) = \mathcal{E}xt^q_{\mathcal{O}}(F, -)$ and $R^n \Gamma(X, \mathcal{H}om_{\mathcal{O}}(F, -)) = \operatorname{Ext}^n_{\mathcal{O}}(F, -)$.

Moreover, $\mathcal{H}om_{\mathcal{O}}(F, -)$ sends injective $\mathcal{O}$-modules to flasque sheaves, which are $\Gamma(X, -)$-acyclic. Hence, the hypothesis is satisfied.

== Derivation ==
We shall use the following lemma:

Lemma—If K is an injective complex in an abelian category C such that the kernels of the differentials are injective objects, then for each n,

$$H^n(K^{\bullet})$$

is an injective object and for any left-exact additive functor G on C,

$$H^n(G(K^{\bullet})) = G(H^n(K^{\bullet})).$$

Proof: Let $Z^n, B^{n+1}$ be the kernel and the image of $d: K^n \to K^{n+1}$. We have

$$0 \to Z^n \to K^n \overset{d}\to B^{n+1} \to 0,$$

which splits. This implies each $B^{n+1}$ is injective. Next we look at

$$0 \to B^n \to Z^n \to H^n(K^{\bullet}) \to 0.$$

It splits, which implies the first part of the lemma, as well as the exactness of

$$0 \to G(B^n) \to G(Z^n) \to G(H^n(K^{\bullet})) \to 0.$$

Similarly we have (using the earlier splitting):

$$0 \to G(Z^n) \to G(K^n) \overset{G(d)} \to G(B^{n+1}) \to 0.$$

The second part now follows. $\square$

We now construct a spectral sequence. Let $A^0 \to A^1 \to \cdots$ be an injective resolution of A. Writing $\phi^p$ for $F(A^p) \to F(A^{p+1})$, we have:

$$0 \to \operatorname{ker} \phi^p \to F(A^p) \overset{\phi^p}\to \operatorname{im} \phi^p \to 0.$$

Take injective resolutions $J^0 \to J^1 \to \cdots$ and $K^0 \to K^1 \to \cdots$ of the first and the third nonzero terms. By the horseshoe lemma, their direct sum $I^{p, \bullet} = J \oplus K$ is an injective resolution of $F(A^p)$. Hence, we found an injective resolution of the complex:

$$0 \to F(A^{\bullet}) \to I^{\bullet, 0} \to I^{\bullet, 1} \to \cdots.$$

such that each row $I^{0, q} \to I^{1, q} \to \cdots$ satisfies the hypothesis of the lemma (cf. the Cartan–Eilenberg resolution.)

Now, the double complex $E_0^{p, q} = G(I^{p, q})$ gives rise to two spectral sequences, horizontal and vertical, which we are now going to examine. On the one hand, by definition,

$${}^{\prime \prime} E_1^{p, q} = H^q(G(I^{p, \bullet})) = R^q G(F(A^p))$$,

which is always zero unless q = 0 since $F(A^p)$ is G-acyclic by hypothesis. Hence, ${}^{\prime \prime} E_{2}^n = R^n (G \circ F) (A)$ and ${}^{\prime \prime} E_2 = {}^{\prime \prime} E_{\infty}$. On the other hand, by the definition and the lemma,

$${}^{\prime} E^{p, q}_1 = H^q(G(I^{\bullet, p})) = G(H^q(I^{\bullet, p})).$$

Since $H^q(I^{\bullet, 0}) \to H^q(I^{\bullet, 1}) \to \cdots$ is an injective resolution of $H^q(F(A^{\bullet})) = R^q F(A)$ (it is a resolution since its cohomology is trivial),

$${}^{\prime} E^{p, q}_2 = R^p G(R^qF(A)).$$

Since ${}^{\prime} E_r$ and ${}^{\prime \prime} E_r$ have the same limiting term, the proof is complete. $\square$
