= Eduard Čech =

Czech mathematician (1893–1960)

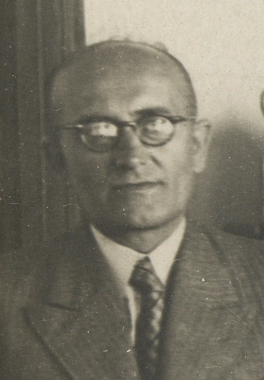
- Eduard Čech at the First International Topology conference in Moscow, 1935
- Born: 29 June 1893; Stračov, Bohemia, Austria-Hungary
- Died: 15 March 1960 (aged 66); Prague, Czechoslovakia
- Education: Charles University (PhD)
- Known for: Stone–Čech compactification Čech cohomology Čech closure operator Čech nerve
- Scientific career
- Fields: Mathematics
- Workplaces: Masaryk University; Charles University
- Thesis: On Curves and Plane Elements of the Third Order (1920)
- Doctoral advisor: Karel Petr
- Doctoral students: Ivo Babuška; Vlastimil Dlab; Zdeněk Frolík; Věra Trnková; Petr Vopěnka

Eduard Čech (Czech: [ˈɛduart ˈtʃɛx]; 29 June 1893 – 15 March 1960) was a Czech mathematician. His research interests included projective differential geometry and topology. He is especially known for the technique known as Stone–Čech compactification (in topology) and the notion of Čech cohomology. He was the first to publish a proof of Tychonoff's theorem in 1937.

== Biography ==
He was born in Stračov, then in Bohemia, Austria-Hungary, now in the Czech Republic. His father was Čeněk Čech, a policeman, and his mother was Anna Kleplová.

After attending the gymnasium in Hradec Králové, Čech was admitted to the Philosophy Faculty of Charles University of Prague in 1912. In 1915 he was drafted into the Austro-Hungarian Army and participated in World War I, after which he completed his undergraduate degree in 1918. He received his doctoral degree in 1920 at Charles University; his thesis, titled On Curves and Plane Elements of the Third Order, was written under the direction of Karel Petr. In 1921–1922 he collaborated with Guido Fubini in Turin, Italy. He taught at Masaryk University in Brno and at Charles University. Ivo Babuška, Vlastimil Dlab, Zdeněk Frolík, Věra Trnková, and Petr Vopěnka were among the notable mathematicians who studied as his doctoral students.

He attended the First International Topological Conference held in Moscow 4–10 September 1935. He made two presentations there: "Accessibility and homology" and "Betti groups with different coefficient groups".

He died in Prague in 1960.

== Publications ==
- Čech, E. (1935), "Les groupes de Betti d'un complexe infini", Fundamenta Mathematicae, 25 (1): 33–44, doi:10.4064/fm-25-1-33-44, hdl:10338.dmlcz/501039
- Čech, E. (1936), "Multiplications on a complex", Annals of Mathematics, 37 (3): 681–697, doi:10.2307/1968483, hdl:10338.dmlcz/501047, JSTOR 1968483
- Čech, E. (1937), "On bicompact spaces", Annals of Mathematics, 38 (4): 823–844, doi:10.2307/1968839, hdl:10338.dmlcz/100459, JSTOR 1968839

== See also ==
- Čech closure operator
- Čech cohomology
- Čech nerve
- Stone–Čech compactification
- Tychonoff's theorem
