= Leray cover =

In mathematics, a Leray cover is a cover of a topological space which allows for easy calculation of its cohomology. Such covers are named after Jean Leray.

== Motivation ==
Sheaf cohomology measures the extent to which a locally exact sequence on a fixed topological space, for instance the de Rham sequence, fails to be globally exact. Its definition, using derived functors, is reasonably natural, if technical. Moreover, important properties, such as the existence of a long exact sequence in cohomology corresponding to any short exact sequence of sheaves, follow directly from the definition. However, it is virtually impossible to calculate from the definition. On the other hand, Čech cohomology with respect to an open cover is well-suited to calculation, but of limited usefulness because it depends on the open cover chosen, not only on the sheaves and the space. By taking a direct limit of Čech cohomology over arbitrarily fine covers, we obtain a Čech cohomology theory that does not depend on the open cover chosen.

In reasonable circumstances (for instance, if the topological space is paracompact), the derived-functor cohomology agrees with this Čech cohomology obtained by direct limits. However, like the derived functor cohomology, this cover-independent Čech cohomology is virtually impossible to calculate from the definition. The Leray condition on an open cover ensures that the cover in question is already "fine enough". The derived functor cohomology agrees with the Čech cohomology with respect to any Leray cover.

== Definition ==
Let $\mathfrak{U} = \{U_i\}$ be an open cover of the topological space $X$, and $\mathcal{F}$ a sheaf on $X$. We say that $\mathfrak{U}$ is a Leray cover with respect to $\mathcal{F}$ if, for every nonempty finite set $\{i_1, \ldots, i_n\}$ of indices, and for all $k > 0$, we have that $H^k(U_{i_1} \cap \cdots \cap U_{i_n}, \mathcal{F}) = 0$ in the derived functor cohomology.

For example, if $X$ is a separated scheme and $\mathcal{F}$ is quasicoherent, then any cover of $X$ by open affine subschemes is a Leray cover.
