= Stračov =

- Municipality
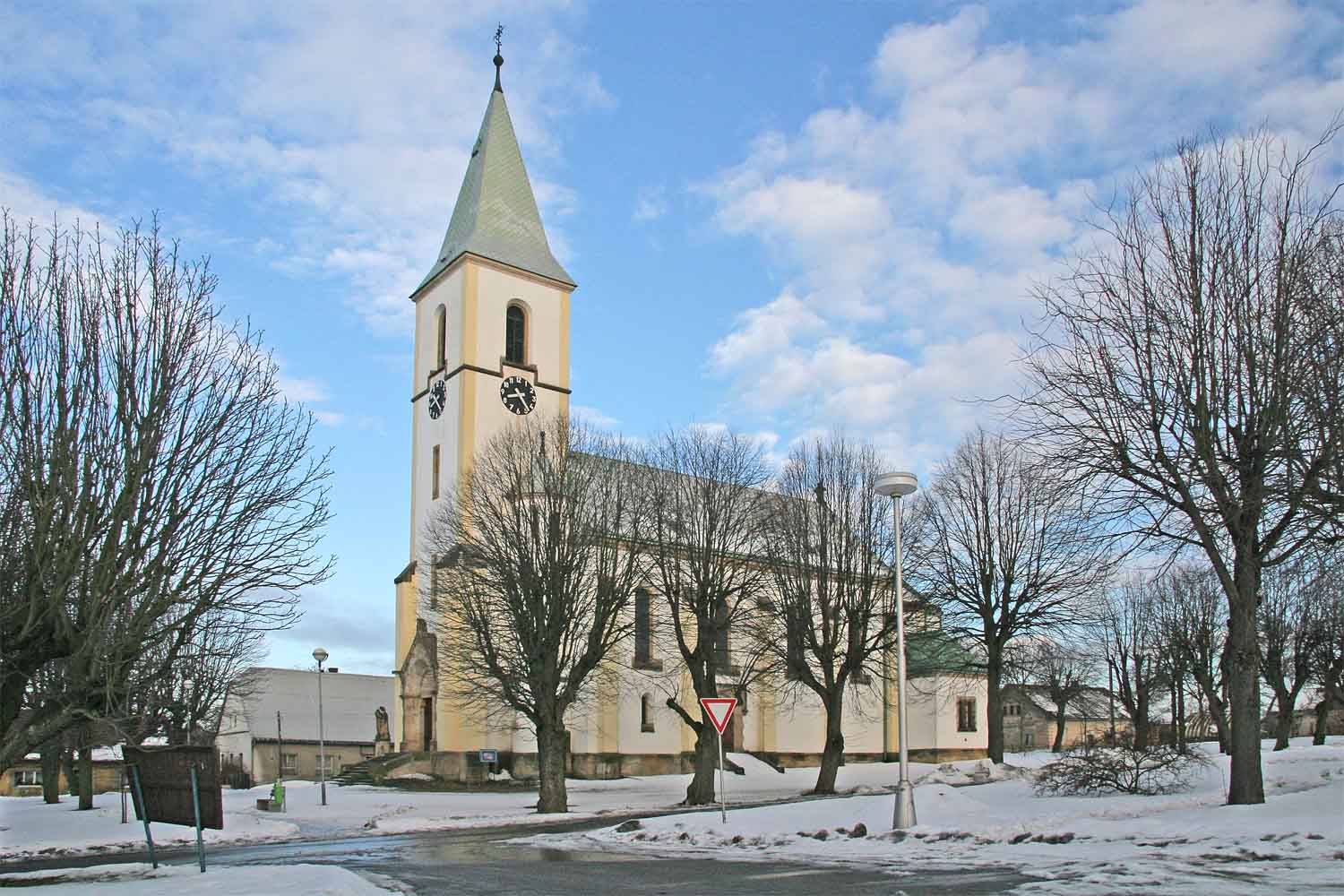
- Church of Saint James the Great

- Flag Coat of arms

- Location in the Czech Republic
- Coordinates: 50°18′6″N 15°38′27″E
- Country: Czech Republic
- Region: Hradec Králové
- District: Hradec Králové
- First mentioned: 1358

Area
  - Total: 8.09 km^{2} (3.12 sq mi)
- Elevation: 245 m (804 ft)

Population (2026-01-01)
  - Total: 314
  - Density: 38.8/km^{2} (101/sq mi)
- Time zone: UTC+1 (CET)
  - Summer (DST): UTC+2 (CEST)
- Postal code: 503 14
- Website: www.stracov.cz

Stračov is a municipality and village in Hradec Králové District in the Hradec Králové Region of the Czech Republic. It has about 300 inhabitants.

== Administrative division ==
Stračov consists of two municipal parts (in brackets population according to the 2021 census):

- Stračov (250)
- Klenice (39)

== Demographics ==
Historical population
| Year | Pop. | ±% |
|---|---|---|
| 1869 | 849 | — |
| 1880 | 863 | +1.6% |
| 1890 | 870 | +0.8% |
| 1900 | 812 | −6.7% |
| 1910 | 739 | −9.0% |
| 1921 | 692 | −6.4% |
| 1930 | 616 | −11.0% |
| 1950 | 493 | −20.0% |
| 1961 | 471 | −4.5% |
| 1970 | 394 | −16.3% |
| 1980 | 349 | −11.4% |
| 1991 | 303 | −13.2% |
| 2001 | 308 | +1.7% |
| 2011 | 317 | +2.9% |
| 2021 | 289 | −8.8% |
Source: Censuses

== Notable people ==
- Eduard Čech (1893–1960), mathematician
