= Věra Trnková =

Czech mathematician

Věra Šedivá-Trnková (March 16, 1934 – 27 May 2018) was a Czech mathematician known for her work in topology and in category theory.

== Early life and education ==
Trnková was born on March 16, 1934, in Berehove, then in Czechoslovakia and now in Ukraine; her father was a forester. By the time she was in high school, her family lived in Prague, and she went to Charles University for study in mathematics. There, she worked with Miroslav Katětov on general topology, earning a master's degree in 1957 with the thesis Collectionwise normal and strongly paracompact spaces on strengthened definitions for normal spaces.

She continued her work on topology at Charles University as a doctoral student of Eduard Čech, earning a candidate's degree (the Czech equivalent of a Ph.D.) in 1961 with the dissertation Non-F-Topologies. Much later, in 1989, she was also given the Dr.Sc. degree, corresponding to a habilitation.

== Later life and career ==
In 1960, while still a student, Trnková became an assistant professor at Charles University. She was promoted to docent (associate professor), senior researcher, and full professor in 1967, 1986, and 1991, respectively.

She became Professor Emeritus in 1999, although she remained active in both teaching and research until a few years before her death on 27 May 2018.

== Research ==
Despite beginning her career working in general topology, Trnková shifted as early as 1962 to category theory. Her work in this area included the study of formal completions of categories, the embeddings of categories into categories of topological spaces, category-theoretic automata theory, and the isomorphism of product objects in categories.

She became the author of over 100 research papers and two monographs:

- Combinatorial, algebraic and topological representations of groups, semigroups and categories (with Aleš Pultr, North-Holland Mathematical Library 22, North-Holland, 1980)
- Automata and algebras in categories (with Jiří Adámek, Mathematics and its Applications 37, Kluwer, 1990)
