= Simon Stevin (journal) =

Mathematics journal begun in 1947

Bulletin of the Belgian Mathematical Society - Simon Stevin
- Discipline: Mathematics
- Language: English, Dutch, French, German
- Edited by: Stefaan Caenepeel

Publication details
- Former name(s): Simon Stevin
- History: 1st series: 1947–1993; 2nd series: 1994 –— present
- Publisher: Belgian Mathematical Society (Belgium)
- Frequency: 5/year

Standard abbreviations
- ISO 4: Bull. Belg. Math. Soc. Simon Stevin

Indexing
- Bull. Belg. Math. Soc. Simon Stevin
- ISSN: 1370-1444
- Simon Stevin
- ISSN: 0037-5454

Links
- Journal homepage; Archive for 2nd series

Simon Stevin was a Dutch language academic journal in pure and applied mathematics, or Wiskunde as the field is known in Dutch. Published in Ghent, edited by Guy Hirsch, it ran for 67 volumes until 1993. The journal is named after Simon Stevin (1548–1620), a Flemish mathematician and engineer.

In 1994, a second series was started from volume 1 under the title Bulletin of the Belgian Mathematical Society - Simon Stevin, and publishes mainly in English. Volumes of the second series are available from Project Euclid: Bulletin of the Belgian Mathematical Society - Simon Stevin.

The editor-in-chief is Stefaan Caenepeel.
