= Alfred Errera =

Belgian mathematician

Alfred Errera (1886 – 1960) was a Belgian mathematician.

Errera studied at the Université libre de Bruxelles, where he received his Ph.D. in 1921 with dissertation Du coloriage des cartes et de quelques questions d'analysis situs. In his dissertation he introduced what is now called the Errera graph, which is a counterexample to the validity of Alfred Kempe's alleged proof of the four color theorem. From 1928 to 1956 he was a professor at the Université libre de Bruxelles.

Errera did research on topology, especially the theory of polyhedra and the Jordan curve theorem. With Théophile Lepage he conducted a seminar on analysis at the University of Brussels.

During World War I, he worked on the acoustic source localization of artillery fire and from 1921 to 1938 taught courses on this subject at the Royal Military Academy.

Errera was an invited speaker at the International Congress of Mathematicians in 1924 in Toronto, in 1932 in Zürich, and in 1936 in Oslo. In 1932 he participated in the Congresul Matematicienilor Români in Drobeta-Turnu Severin. In 1935 he gave a talk at the inaugural Congrés International des Récréations Mathématiques in Brussels. His doctoral students included Guy Hirsch.

== Selected publications ==
- Un théorème sur les liaisons, 1923
- Periodico matematico, 1927
- Analysis situs: un problème d’énumération, Brüssel, M. Lamertin 1931
- Sur un problème de géométrie infinitésimale, Brüssel, M. Lamertin 1932
