= Théophile Lepage =

Belgian mathematician

- Born: 24 March 1901; Limburg
- Died: 1 April 1991 (aged 90); Verviers
- Education: Université libre de Bruxelles
- Known for: Congruence of Lepage; Calculus of variations Lepagian forms
- Scientific career
- Fields: Mathematics
- Doctoral advisor: Théophile de Donder

Théophile Henri Joseph Lepage (24 March 1901 – 1 April 1991) was a Belgian mathematician.

== Biography ==
Théophile Lepage was born in Limburg on March 24, 1901. Together with Alfred Errera he founded the seminar for mathematical analysis at the ULB. This seminar played an important role in the flourishing of the department of mathematics at this university. He was professor of mathematics at the University of Liège from 1928 till 1930. He taught differential and integral calculus at the ULB from 1931 till 1956 and higher analysis from 1956 till 1971.

For 43 years he was a member of the Académie Royale des Sciences, des Lettres et des Beaux-Arts de Belgique. On June 5, 1948, he was nominated a corresponding member and on June 9, 1956, an effective member of the Académie. In 1963 he became president of the Académie and director of the Klasse Wetenschappen. He was also active in the Belgisch Wiskundig Genootschap.

He died in Verviers on April 1, 1991.

== Mathematical work ==
At the ULB, the ideas and the enthusiasm of Théophile de Donder formed the foundation of a mathematical tradition. Thanks to student Théophile Lepage, external differential calculus acquired one of the most helpful methods introduced in mathematics during the 20th century, and one for which De Donder was a pioneer, presenting new applications in the resolution of a classical problem—the partial differential equation of Monge-Ampère—and in the synthesis of the methods of Théophile de Donder, Hermann Weyl and Constantin Carathéodory into a calculus of variations of multiple integrals.

Thanks to the use of differential geometry, it is possible to avoid long and boring calculations. The results of Lepage were named in reference works. His methods are still inspiring contemporary mathematicians: Boener and Sniatycki talked about the congruence of Lepage; not so long ago, Demeter Krupka, introduced—beside the eulerian forms which correspond to the classical equations of the calculus of variations of Euler—the so-called lepagian forms or equivalents of Lepage in equations of variations on fiber spaces.

We also have Lepage to thank for interesting results concerning linear representations of the symplectic group, and more specifically Lepage's dissolution of an outer potency of the product of an even number of duplicates of a complex surface.
