= Leray's theorem =

Relates abstract sheaf cohomology with Čech cohomology

In algebraic topology and algebraic geometry, Leray's theorem (so named after Jean Leray) relates abstract sheaf cohomology with Čech cohomology.

Let $\mathcal{F}$ be a sheaf on a topological space $X$ and $\mathcal{U} = \{U_i\}_{i \in I}$ an open cover of $X$. If $\mathcal{F}$ is acyclic on every finite intersection of elements of $\mathcal{U}$ (meaning that $H^k(U_{i_0} \cap \dots \cap U_{i_n}, \mathcal{F}) = 0$ for all $k \geq 1$ and all finite intersections $U_{i_0} \cap \dots \cap U_{i_n}$), then there is an isomorphism

$\check{H}^q(\mathcal{U}, \mathcal{F}) \cong H^q(X, \mathcal{F})$

for all $q \geq 0$, where $\check{H}^q(\mathcal{U}, \mathcal{F})$ is the $q$-th Čech cohomology group of $\mathcal{F}$ with respect to the open cover $\mathcal{U}$, and $H^q(X, \mathcal{F})$ is the abstract sheaf cohomology group.

== Proof ==
The standard modern proof of Leray's theorem relies on spectral sequences, specifically the Čech-to-derived functor spectral sequence.

Let $\mathcal{F}$ be a sheaf on $X$ and $\mathcal{U}$ an open cover. There exists a spectral sequence relating Čech cohomology to abstract sheaf cohomology, whose second page is given by:

$E_2^{p,q} = \check{H}^p(\mathcal{U}, \mathcal{H}^q(\mathcal{F})) \Rightarrow H^{p+q}(X, \mathcal{F})$

where $\mathcal{H}^q(\mathcal{F})$ denotes the presheaf defined by $V \mapsto H^q(V, \mathcal{F})$.

The acyclicity hypothesis states that for any finite intersection $V = U_{i_0} \cap \dots \cap U_{i_p}$ of sets in $\mathcal{U}$, we have $H^q(V, \mathcal{F}) = 0$ for all $q \geq 1$. Consequently, the presheaf $\mathcal{H}^q(\mathcal{F})$ evaluates to $0$ on all finite intersections of the cover.

This implies that the Čech complex computing $\check{H}^p(\mathcal{U}, \mathcal{H}^q(\mathcal{F}))$ is identically zero for $q \geq 1$. Therefore, the spectral sequence degenerates at the $E_2$ page:

$E_2^{p,q} = 0 \quad \text{for } q > 0$

Because the spectral sequence degenerates, the terms on the $p$-axis of the second page are isomorphic to the target of the spectral sequence:

$E_2^{p,0} \cong H^p(X, \mathcal{F})$

For $q = 0$, the presheaf $\mathcal{H}^0(\mathcal{F})$ assigns to each open set $V$ the module of sections $H^0(V, \mathcal{F}) = \mathcal{F}(V)$. Thus, $\mathcal{H}^0(\mathcal{F})$ is exactly the sheaf $\mathcal{F}$ itself, which means $E_2^{p,0} = \check{H}^p(\mathcal{U}, \mathcal{F})$. This collapse yields the desired isomorphism:

$\check{H}^p(\mathcal{U}, \mathcal{F}) \cong H^p(X, \mathcal{F})$
