= Claus Michael Ringel =

German mathematician (born 1945)

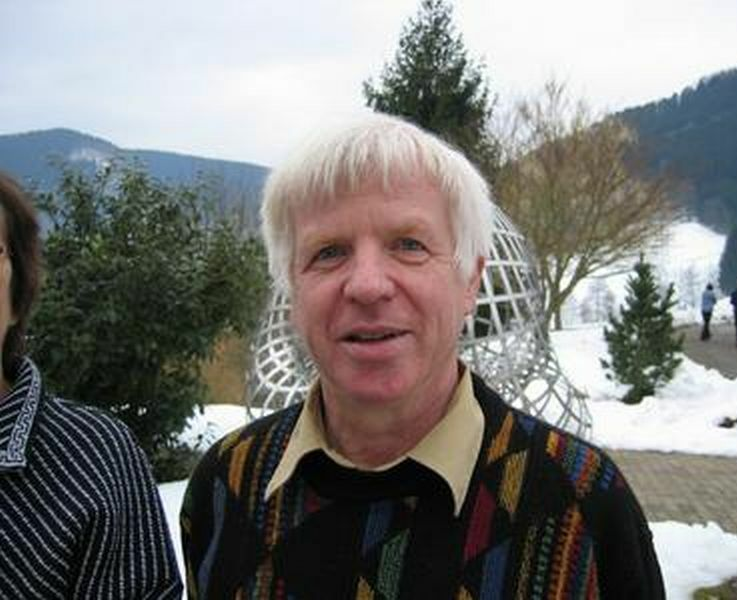
Ringel in 2005

Claus Michael Ringel (born 10 February 1945) is a German mathematician, specializing in algebra.

== Education and career ==
Ringel was born on 10 February 1945, in Zwickau. He studied mathematics, physics and philosophy beginning in 1964 at the Goethe University Frankfurt with the Diplom degree in mathematics in 1968. He received in 1969 from the Goethe University Frankfurt his doctorate under the supervision of Friedrich-Wilhelm Bauer with thesis Diagonalisierungspaare in der Homologischen Algebra (Diagonalization Pairs in Homological Algebra). He then became a research assistant at the University of Tübingen and in 1971/72 an assistant professor at Carleton University (where he collaborated with Vlastimil Dlab). In 1972 he habilitated in Tübingen and became there a Universitätsdozent.

In 1974, Ringel became a scientific advisor and professor at the University of Bonn. From 1978 until his retirement in 2010, he was a professor at Bielefeld University. From 2010 to 2013, he was a visiting professor at Shanghai Jiao Tong University. Since 2000, he has occasionally been a visiting professor at the University of Science and Technology of China in Hefei, and since 2011, he has occasionally taught as an adjunct professor at King Abdulaziz University in Jeddah.

== Research ==
Ringel's research deals with the representation theory of algebras. From 1991 to 2000 he led the project Representation of Algebras and from 1995 to 2000 the project Structure of Quantum Groups in the Collaborative Research Center 343's Discrete Structures in Mathematics; he also led the project Topological and Spectral Structures in Representation Theory in the Collaborative Research Center 701's Spectral Structures and Topological Methods in Mathematics. He has published over 140 papers (2005) and was ranked Highly Cited Researcher at the ISI in 2004.

Ringel was elected a Fellow of the American Mathematical Society in 2012. He was an Invited Speaker at the International Congress of Mathematicians in 1983 in Warsaw with talk Indecomposable representations of finite-dimensional algebras. He is a member of the Royal Norwegian Society of Sciences and Letters and honorary doctor of the Norwegian University of Science and Technology in Trondheim.

In 2005 and 2006, he was chair of the Review Board for Mathematics at the Deutsche Forschungsgemeinschaft.

== Selected publications ==
=== Articles ===
- Happel, Dieter; Ringel, Claus Michael (1982). "Tilted algebras". Transactions of the American Mathematical Society. 274 (2): 399. doi:10.1090/s0002-9947-1982-0675063-2. MR 0675063.
- Unzerlegbare Darstellungen endlich-dimensionaler Algebren, Jahresbericht DMV 85 (1983), 86–105
- Dlab, Vlastimil; Ringel, Claus Michael (1989). "Quasi-hereditary algebras". Illinois Journal of Mathematics. 33 (2): 280–291. doi:10.1215/ijm/1255988725. MR 0987824.
- Hall algebras and quantum groups, Inventions Mathematicae 100, no. 1 (1990), 583–591 doi:10.1007/BF01231516
- Hall algebras, Banach Center Publications 26, no. 1 (1990): 433–447
- Recent advances in the theory of finite dimensional algebras. (1984-1990), Progress in Mathematics 95, Birkhäuser 1991, pp. 141–192 doi:10.1007/978-3-0348-8658-1_6
- Ringel, Claus Michael (1991). "The category of modules with good filtrations over a quasi-hereditary algebra has almost split sequences". Mathematische Zeitschrift. 208 (1): 209–223. doi:10.1007/bf02571521. MR 1128706. S2CID 120409415.
- The elementary 3-Kronecker modules, arXiv:1612.09141v (2016)

=== Books ===
- with Vlastimil Dlab: Indecomposable representations of graphs and algebras, AMS 1976 ISBN 0-8218-1873-2
- Tame Algebras and Integral Quadratic Forms, Springer Verlag 1984; Chapter 1 preview. doi:10.1007/BFb0072871.
- with Vlastimil Dlab: Representations of finite dimensional algebra and related topics in Lie theory and geometry, AMS 2004 ISBN 978-0-8218-3416-9 doi:10.1090/fic/040
- as editor with Henning Krause: Infinite Length Modules, Birkhäuser 2000 ISBN 978-3-7643-6413-7 doi:10.1007/978-3-0348-8426-6
