= Quillen spectral sequence =

In the area of mathematics known as K-theory, the Quillen spectral sequence, also called the Brown–Gersten–Quillen or BGQ spectral sequence (named after Kenneth Brown, Stephen Gersten, and Daniel Quillen), is a spectral sequence converging to the sheaf cohomology of a type of topological space that occurs in algebraic geometry. It is used in calculating the homotopy properties of a simplicial group.
