= Leray–Schauder degree =

In mathematics, the Leray–Schauder degree is an extension of the degree of a base point preserving continuous map between spheres $(S^n, *) \to (S^n , *)$ or equivalently to boundary-sphere-preserving continuous maps between balls $(B^n, S^{n-1}) \to (B^n, S^{n-1})$ to boundary-sphere-preserving maps between balls in a Banach space $f: (B(V), S(V)) \to (B(V), S(V))$, assuming that the map is of the form $f = id - C$ where $id$ is the identity map and $C$ is some compact map (i.e. mapping bounded sets to sets whose closure is compact).

The degree was invented by Jean Leray and Juliusz Schauder to prove existence results for partial differential equations.
