= Vlastimil Dlab =

Czech-born Canadian mathematician

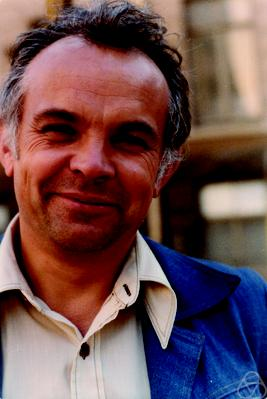
Vlastimil Dlab

Vlastimil Dlab (born 5 August 1932) is a Czech-born Canadian mathematician who has worked in Czechoslovakia, Sudan, Australia and especially Canada where he founded and led an influential department of modern mathematics.

== Biography ==
Dlab was born on August 5, 1932, in Bzí, Czechoslovakia, a historical village whose territory currently belongs to Železný Brod. He studied at Charles University in Prague, and worked at the Czechoslovak Academy of Sciences for a while in 1956. At Charles University, he was gradually promoted to associate professor. However. Between 1954 and 1964, he was doing university research in Khartoum in Sudan. Between 1964 and 1965 he returned Prague but the Institute of Advanced Studies in Canberra, Australia attracted him between 1965 and 1968.

After the 1968 Warsaw Pact invasion of Czechoslovakia, he wasn't quite embraced with open arms. So in 1971, he left for Ottawa, Canada where he founded and led a department of modern mathematics at Carleton University that has significantly influenced the world of algebra, probability, and statistics.

Because his father was ill in the early 1980s, Dlab – as an alien – was allowed to visit Czechoslovakia and he restored his relationship with Charles University. In the late 1980s, he taught some courses again there, and he regained full professorship in 1992.

== Academic ancestry and collaborators ==
Dlab was a postdoctoral student of renowned Czech mathematician Eduard Čech.

While in Canada, Dlab worked as the editor-of-chief of mathematical journals and chairman of assorted organizations and institutions. In 1977, he was elected a fellow of the Royal Society of Canada.

Claus Michael Ringel was the co-author of some of the most famous academic works by Dlab, such as the 1976 book Indecomposable representations of graphs and algebras. Dlab helped to educate numerous students of mathematics who became successful by themselves.

== Teaching of mathematics ==
In recent years, Dlab was very active in efforts to improve the mathematics education. In the Czech Republic, he's been often quoted as an authority that is skeptical towards modern methods to teach, e.g. the method of Milan Hejný. He emphasizes the key role played by the quality of teachers.

== See also ==
- Eduard Čech
