= Nerve complex =

Complex recording the pattern of intersections between a topological family's sets

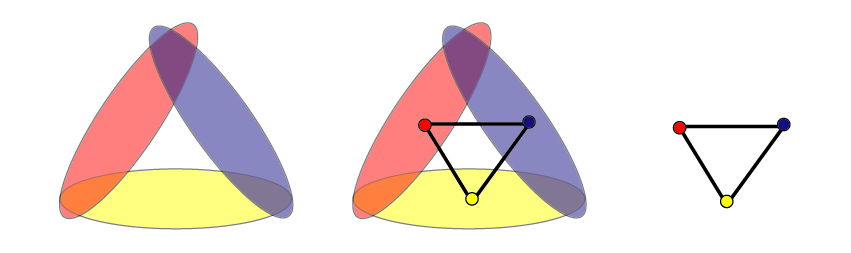
Constructing the nerve of an open good cover containing 3 sets in the plane.

In topology, the nerve complex of a set family is an abstract complex that records the pattern of intersections between the sets in the family. It was introduced by Pavel Alexandrov and now has many variants and generalisations, among them the Čech nerve of a cover, which in turn is generalised by hypercoverings. It captures many of the interesting topological properties in an algorithmic or combinatorial way.

== Basic definition ==
Let $I$ be a set of indices and $C$ be a family of sets $(U_i)_{i\in I}$. The nerve of $C$ is a set of finite subsets of the index set $I$. It contains all finite subsets $J\subseteq I$ such that the intersection of the $U_i$ whose subindices are in $J$ is non-empty:

$$N(C) :=  \bigg\{J\subseteq I: \bigcap_{j\in J}U_j \neq \varnothing, J \text{ finite set} \bigg\}.$$

In Alexandrov's original definition, the sets $(U_i)_{i\in I}$ are open subsets of some topological space $X$.

The set $N(C)$ may contain singletons (elements $i \in I$ such that $U_i$ is non-empty), pairs (pairs of elements $i,j \in I$ such that $U_i \cap U_j \neq \emptyset$), triplets, and so on. If $J \in N(C)$, then any subset of $J$ is also in $N(C)$, making $N(C)$ an abstract simplicial complex. Hence N(C) is often called the nerve complex of $C$.

== Examples ==
1. Let X be the circle $S^1$ and $C = \{U_1, U_2\}$, where $U_1$ is an arc covering the upper half of $S^1$ and $U_2$ is an arc covering its lower half, with some overlap at both sides (they must overlap at both sides in order to cover all of $S^1$). Then $N(C) = \{ \{1\}, \{2\}, \{1,2\} \}$, which is an abstract 1-simplex.
2. Let X be the circle $S^1$ and $C = \{U_1, U_2, U_3\}$, where each $U_i$ is an arc covering one third of $S^1$, with some overlap with the adjacent $U_i$. Then $N(C) = \{ \{1\}, \{2\}, \{3\}, \{1,2\}, \{2,3\}, \{3,1\} \}$. Note that {1,2,3} is not in $N(C)$ since the common intersection of all three sets is empty; so $N(C)$ is an unfilled triangle.
3. Let $P$ be a finite set of points in general position (no four points are cocircular) in $\mathbb{R}^2$, and let $C = \{V_p\}_{p \in P}$ be the set of cells of the Voronoi diagram of $P$. Then the nerve $N(C)$ is the Delaunay triangulation of $P$. Note that the Voronoi cells are closed sets, so this is a nerve of a closed cover rather than an open one; however, the definition of the nerve applies to arbitrary set families.

== The Čech nerve ==
Given an open cover $C=\{U_i: i\in I\}$ of a topological space $X$, or more generally a cover in a site, we can consider the pairwise fibre products $U_{ij}=U_i\times_XU_j$, which in the case of a topological space are precisely the intersections $U_i\cap U_j$. The collection of all such intersections can be referred to as $C\times_X C$ and the triple intersections as $C\times_X C\times_X C$.

By considering the natural maps $U_{ij}\to U_i$ and $U_i\to U_{ii}$, we can construct a simplicial object $S(C)_\bullet$ defined by $S(C)_n=C\times_X\cdots\times_XC$, n-fold fibre product. This is the Čech nerve.

By taking connected components we get a simplicial set, which we can realise topologically: $|S(\pi_0(C))|$.

== Nerve theorems ==
The nerve complex $N(C)$ is a simple combinatorial object. Often, it is much simpler than the underlying topological space (the union of the sets in $C$). Therefore, a natural question is whether the topology of $N(C)$ is equivalent to the topology of $\bigcup C$.

In general, this need not be the case. For example, one can cover any n-sphere with two contractible sets $U_1$ and $U_2$ that have a non-empty intersection, as in example 1 above. In this case, $N(C)$ is an abstract 1-simplex, which is similar to a line but not to a sphere.

However, in some cases $N(C)$ does reflect the topology of X. For example, if a circle is covered by three open arcs, intersecting in pairs as in Example 2 above, then $N(C)$ is a 2-simplex (without its interior) and it is homotopy-equivalent to the original circle.

A nerve theorem (or nerve lemma) is a theorem that gives sufficient conditions on C guaranteeing that $N(C)$ reflects, in some sense, the topology of $\bigcup C$. A functorial nerve theorem is a nerve theorem that is functorial in an appropriate sense, which is, for example, crucial in topological data analysis.

=== Leray's nerve theorem ===
The basic nerve theorem of Jean Leray says that, if any intersection of sets in $N(C)$ is contractible (equivalently: for each finite $J\subset I$ the set $\bigcap_{i\in J} U_i$ is either empty or contractible; equivalently: C is a good open cover), then $N(C)$ is homotopy-equivalent to $\bigcup C$.

=== Borsuk's nerve theorem ===
There is a discrete version, which is attributed to Borsuk. Let K_{1},...,K_{n} be abstract simplicial complexes, and denote their union by K. Let U_{i} = ||K_{i}|| = the geometric realization of K_{i}, and denote the nerve of {U_{1}, ... , U_{n} } by N.

If, for each nonempty $J\subset I$, the intersection $\bigcap_{i\in J} U_i$ is either empty or contractible, then N is homotopy-equivalent to K.

A stronger theorem was proved by Anders Bjorner. If, for each nonempty $J\subset I$, the intersection $\bigcap_{i\in J} U_i$ is either empty or (k-|J|+1)-connected, then for every j ≤ k, the j-th homotopy group of N is isomorphic to the j-th homotopy group of K. In particular, N is k-connected if-and-only-if K is k-connected.

=== Čech nerve theorem ===
Another nerve theorem relates to the Čech nerve above: if $X$ is compact and all intersections of sets in C are contractible or empty, then the space $|S(\pi_0(C))|$ is homotopy-equivalent to $X$.

=== Homological nerve theorem ===
The following nerve theorem uses the homology groups of intersections of sets in the cover. For each finite $J\subset I$, denote $H_{J,j} := \tilde{H}_j(\bigcap_{i\in J} U_i)=$ the j-th reduced homology group of $\bigcap_{i\in J} U_i$.

If H_{J,j} is the trivial group for all J in the k-skeleton of N(C) and for all j in {0, ..., k-dim(J)}, then N(C) is "homology-equivalent" to X in the following sense:

- $\tilde{H}_j(N(C)) \cong \tilde{H}_j(X)$ for all j in {0, ..., k};
- if $\tilde{H}_{k+1}(N(C))\not\cong 0$ then $\tilde{H}_{k+1}(X)\not\cong 0$ .
