= Leray spectral sequence =

Mathematical sequence

In mathematics, the Leray spectral sequence was a pioneering example in homological algebra, introduced in 1946 by Jean Leray. It is usually seen nowadays as a special case of the Grothendieck spectral sequence.

== Definition ==
Let $f:X\to Y$ be a continuous map of topological spaces, which in particular gives a functor $f_*$ from sheaves of abelian groups on $X$ to sheaves of abelian groups on $Y$. Composing this with the functor $\Gamma$ of taking sections on $\text{Sh}_\text{Ab}(Y)$ is the same as taking sections on $\text{Sh}_\text{Ab}(X)$, by the definition of the direct image functor $f_*$:

$$\mathrm{Sh_{Ab}} (X) \xrightarrow{f_*} \mathrm{Sh_{Ab}}(Y) \xrightarrow{\Gamma} \mathrm{Ab}.$$

Thus the derived functors of $\Gamma \circ f_*$ compute the sheaf cohomology for $X$:

$$R^i (\Gamma \cdot f_*)(\mathcal{F})=H^i(X,\mathcal{F}).$$

But because $f_*$ and $\Gamma$ send injective objects in $\text{Sh}_\text{Ab}(X)$ to $\Gamma$-acyclic objects in $\text{Sh}_\text{Ab}(Y)$, there is a spectral sequence^{pg 33,19} whose second page is

$$E^{pq}_2=(R^p\Gamma \cdot R^q f_*)(\mathcal{F})=H^p(Y,R^qf_*(\mathcal{F})) ,$$

and which converges to

$$E^{p+q} = R^{p+q}(\Gamma \circ f_*)(\mathcal{F})= H^{p+q}(X,\mathcal{F}) .$$

This is called the Leray spectral sequence.

=== Generalizing to other sheaves and complexes of sheaves ===
Note this result can be generalized by instead considering sheaves of modules over a locally constant sheaf of rings $\underline{A}$ for a fixed commutative ring $A$. Then, the sheaves will be sheaves of $\underline{A}$-modules, where for an open set $U \subset X$, such a sheaf $\mathcal{F} \in \text{Sh}_{\underline{A}}(X)$ is an $\underline{A}(U)$-module for $\mathcal{F}(U)$. In addition, instead of sheaves, we could consider complexes of sheaves bounded below $\mathcal{F}^\bullet \in D^+_{\underline{A}}(X)$ for the derived category of $\text{Sh}_{\underline{A}}(X)$. Then, one replaces sheaf cohomology with sheaf hypercohomology.

=== Construction ===
The existence of the Leray spectral sequence is a direct application of the Grothendieck spectral sequence^{pg 19}. This states that given additive functors

$$\mathcal{A} \xrightarrow{G}\mathcal{B} \xrightarrow{F} \mathcal{C}$$

between Abelian categories having enough injectives, $F$ a left-exact functor, and $G$ sending injective objects to $F$-acyclic objects, then there is an isomorphism of derived functors

$$R^+(F\circ G) \simeq R^+F\circ R^+G$$

for the derived categories $D^+(\mathcal{A}),D^+(\mathcal{B}), D^+(\mathcal{C})$. In the example above, we have the composition of derived functors

$$D^+(\text{Sh}_\text{Ab}(X)) \xrightarrow{Rf_*} D^+(\text{Sh}_\text{Ab}(Y)) \xrightarrow{\Gamma} D^+(\text{Ab}).$$

== Classical definition ==
Let $f\colon X\to Y$ be a continuous map of smooth manifolds. If $\mathcal{U} = \{U_i\}_{i \in I}$ is an open cover of $Y$, form the Čech complex of a sheaf $\mathcal{F} \in \text{Sh}(X)$ with respect to cover $f^{-1}(U)$ of $X$:

$$\text{C}^p(f^{-1}\mathcal{U}, \mathcal{F})$$

The boundary maps $d^p\colon C^p \to C^{p+1}$ and maps $\delta^q\colon \Omega^q_X \to \Omega_X^{q+1}$ of sheaves on $X$ together give a boundary map on the double complex $\text{C}^p(f^{-1}\mathcal{U}, \Omega_X^q)$

$$D=d+\delta \colon   C^\bullet(f^{-1}\mathcal{U},\Omega_X^\bullet)\longrightarrow C^\bullet(f^{-1}\mathcal{U},\Omega_X^\bullet) .$$

This double complex is also a single complex graded by $n=p+q$, with respect to which $D$ is a boundary map. If each finite intersection of the $U_i$ is diffeomorphic to $\R^n$, one can show that the cohomology

$$H_D^n( C^\bullet(f^{-1}\mathcal{U},\Omega_X^\bullet)) = H_\text{dR}^n(X,\R)$$

of this complex is the de Rham cohomology of $X$. Moreover, any double complex has a spectral sequence E with

$$E_\infty^{n-p,p} = \text{the }p\text{th graded part of } H^n_{dR}( C^\bullet(f^{-1}\mathcal{U},\Omega_X^\bullet))$$

(so that the sum of these is $H^n_{dR}$), and

$$E_2^{p,q} = H^p(f^{-1}\mathcal{U}, \mathcal{H}^q),$$

where $\mathcal{H}^q$ is the presheaf on Y sending $U \mapsto H^q(f^{-1}(U), F)$. In this context, this is called the Leray spectral sequence.

The modern definition subsumes this, because the higher direct image functor $R^pf_*(F)$ is the sheafification of the presheaf $U \mapsto H^q(f^{-1}(U), F)$.

== Examples ==
- Let $X,F$ be smooth manifolds, and $X$ be simply connected, so $\pi_1(X) = 0$. We calculate the Leray spectral sequence of the projection $f\colon X\times F \to X$. If the cover $\mathcal{U} = \{U_i\}_{i \in I}$ is good (finite intersections are $\R^n$) then

$$\mathcal{H}^p(f^{-1}U_i)\simeq H^q(F)$$

Since $X$ is simply connected, any locally constant presheaf is constant, so this is the constant presheaf $H^q(F) = \underline{\R}^{n_q}$. So the second page of the Leray spectral sequence is

$$E_2^{p,q} = H^p(f^{-1}\mathcal{U}, H^q(F))=H^p(f^{-1}\mathcal{U}, \R)\otimes H^q(F)$$

As the cover $\{f^{-1}(U_i)\}_{i \in I}$ of $X\times F$ is also good, $H^p(f^{-1}(U_i);\R) \cong H^p(f;\R)$. So

$$E_2^{p,q} = H^p(X)\otimes H^q(F) \ \Longrightarrow \  H^{p+q}(X\times F,\R)$$

Here is the first place we use that $f$ is a projection and not just a fibre bundle: every element of $E_2$ is an actual closed differential form on all of $X\times F$, so applying both d and $\delta$ to them gives zero. Thus $E_\infty = E_2$. This proves the Künneth theorem for $X$ simply connected:

$$H^\bullet(X\times Y,\R)\simeq H^\bullet(X)\otimes H^\bullet(Y)$$

- If $f\colon X \to Y$ is a general fiber bundle with fibre $F$, the above applies, except that $V^p \to H^p(f^{-1}V,H^q)$ is only a locally constant presheaf, not constant.
- All example computations with the Serre spectral sequence are the Leray sequence for the constant sheaf.

== Degeneration theorem ==
In the category of quasi-projective varieties over $\Complex$, there is a degeneration theorem proved by Pierre Deligne and Blanchard for the Leray spectral sequence, which states that a smooth projective morphism of varieties $f\colon X \to Y$ gives us that the $E_2$-page of the spectral sequence for $\underline{\Q}_X$ degenerates, hence

$$H^k(X;\Q) \cong \bigoplus_{p + q = k} H^{p}(Y;\mathbf{R}^qf_*(\underline{\Q}_X)).$$

Easy examples can be computed if Y is simply connected; for example a complete intersection of dimension $\geq 2$ (this is because of the Hurewicz homomorphism and the Lefschetz hyperplane theorem). In this case the local systems $\mathbf{R}^qf_*(\underline{\Q}_X)$ will have trivial monodromy, hence $\mathbf{R}^qf_*(\underline{\Q}_X) \cong \underline{\Q}_Y^{\oplus l_q}$. For example, consider a smooth family $f\colon X\to Y$ of genus 3 curves over a smooth K3 surface. Then, we have that

$$\begin{align}
\mathbf{R}^0f_*(\underline{\Q}_X) &\cong \underline{\Q}_Y \\
\mathbf{R}^1f_*(\underline{\Q}_X) &\cong \underline{\Q}_Y^{\oplus 6} \\
\mathbf{R}^2f_*(\underline{\Q}_X) &\cong \underline{\Q}_Y
\end{align}$$

giving us the $E_2$-page

$$E_2 = E_\infty = \begin{bmatrix}
H^0(Y;\underline{\Q}_Y) & 0 & H^2(Y;\underline{\Q}_Y) & 0 & H^4(Y;\underline{\Q}_Y) \\
H^0(Y;\underline{\Q}_Y^{\oplus 6}) & 0 & H^2(Y;\underline{\Q}_Y^{\oplus 6}) & 0 & H^4(Y;\underline{\Q}_Y^{\oplus 6}) \\
H^0(Y;\underline{\Q}_Y) & 0 & H^2(Y;\underline{\Q}_Y) & 0 & H^4(Y;\underline{\Q}_Y)
\end{bmatrix}$$

=== Example with monodromy ===
Another important example of a smooth projective family is the family associated to the elliptic curves

$$y^2 = x(x-1)(x-t)$$

over $\mathbb{P}^1 \setminus \{0, 1, \infty \}$. Here the monodromy around 0 and 1 can be computed using Picard–Lefschetz theory, giving the monodromy around $\infty$ by composing local monodromies.

== History and connection to other spectral sequences ==
At the time of Leray's work, neither of the two concepts involved (spectral sequence, sheaf cohomology) had reached anything like a definitive state. Therefore it is rarely the case that Leray's result is quoted in its original form. After much work, in the seminar of Henri Cartan in particular, the modern statement was obtained, though not the general Grothendieck spectral sequence.

Earlier (1948/9) the implications for fiber bundles were extracted in a form formally identical to that of the Serre spectral sequence, which makes no use of sheaves. This treatment, however, applied to Alexander–Spanier cohomology with compact supports, as applied to proper maps of locally compact Hausdorff spaces, as the derivation of the spectral sequence required a fine sheaf of real differential graded algebras on the total space, which was obtained by pulling back the de Rham complex along an embedding into a sphere. Jean-Pierre Serre, who needed a spectral sequence in homology that applied to path space fibrations, whose total spaces are almost never locally compact, thus was unable to use the original Leray spectral sequence and so derived a related spectral sequence whose cohomological variant agrees, for a compact fiber bundle on a well-behaved space with the sequence above.

In the formulation achieved by Alexander Grothendieck by about 1957, the Leray spectral sequence is the Grothendieck spectral sequence for the composition of two derived functors.

== See also ==
- Serre spectral sequence - for more examples
- Grothendieck spectral sequence - for abstract theory subsuming the construction for the Leray spectral sequence
- Mixed Hodge module
