= Guy Hirsch =

Belgian mathematician and professor

- Born: 20 September 1915; London
- Died: 4 August 1993 (aged 77); Brussels
- Education: Université libre de Bruxelles
- Known for: algebraic topology
- Scientific career
- Fields: Mathematics
- Workplaces: Université libre de Bruxelles
- Doctoral advisor: Alfred Errera

Guy Hirsch (20 September 1915 – 4 August 1993) was a Belgian mathematician and philosopher of mathematics, who worked on algebraic topology and epistemology of mathematics.

He became a member of the Royal Flemish Academy of Belgium for Science and the Arts in 1973.

He is known for the Leray–Hirsch theorem, a basic result on the algebraic topology of fiber bundles that he proved independently of Jean Leray in the late 1940s.
