= Acyclic object =

In mathematics, in the field of homological algebra, given an abelian category $\mathcal{C}$ having enough injectives and an additive (covariant) functor

$$F :\mathcal{C}\to\mathcal{D}$$,

an acyclic object with respect to $F$, or simply an $F$-acyclic object, is an object $A$ in $\mathcal{C}$ such that

${\rm R}^i F (A) = 0 \,\!$ for all $i>0 \,\!$,

where ${\rm R}^i F$ are the right derived functors of $F$.
