= Čech cohomology =

Theory in algebraic topology

A Penrose triangle depicts a nontrivial element of the first cohomology of an annulus with values in the group of distances from the observer.

In mathematics, specifically algebraic topology, Čech cohomology is a cohomology theory based on the intersection properties of open covers of a topological space. It is named for the mathematician Eduard Čech.

== Motivation ==
Let X be a topological space, and let $\mathcal{U}$ be an open cover of X. Let $N(\mathcal{U})$ denote the nerve of the covering. The idea of Čech cohomology is that, for an open cover $\mathcal{U}$ consisting of sufficiently small open sets, the resulting simplicial complex $N(\mathcal{U})$ should be a good combinatorial model for the space X. For such a cover, the Čech cohomology of X is defined to be the simplicial cohomology of the nerve. This idea can be formalized by the notion of a good cover. However, a more general approach is to take the direct limit of the cohomology groups of the nerve over the system of all possible open covers of X, ordered by refinement. This is the approach adopted below.

== Construction ==
Let X be a topological space, and let $\mathcal{F}$ be a presheaf of abelian groups on X. Let $\mathcal{U}$ be an open cover of X.

=== Simplex ===
A q-simplex σ of $\mathcal{U}$ is an ordered collection of q+1 sets chosen from $\mathcal{U}$, such that the intersection of all these sets is non-empty. This intersection is called the support of σ and is denoted |σ|.

Now let $\sigma = (U_i)_{i \in \{ 0 , \ldots , q \}}$ be such a q-simplex. The j-th partial boundary of σ is defined to be the (q−1)-simplex obtained by removing the j-th set from σ, that is:

$$\partial_j \sigma := (U_i)_{i \in \{ 0 , \ldots , q \} \setminus \{j\}}.$$

The boundary of σ is defined as the alternating sum of the partial boundaries:

$$\partial \sigma := \sum_{j=0}^q (-1)^{j+1} \partial_j \sigma$$

viewed as an element of the free abelian group spanned by the simplices of $\mathcal{U}$.

=== Cochain ===
A q-cochain of $\mathcal{U}$ with coefficients in $\mathcal{F}$ is a map which associates with each q-simplex σ an element of $\mathcal{F}(|\sigma|)$, and we denote the set of all q-cochains of $\mathcal{U}$ with coefficients in $\mathcal{F}$ by $C^q(\mathcal U, \mathcal F)$. $C^q(\mathcal U, \mathcal F)$ is an abelian group by pointwise addition.

=== Differential ===
The cochain groups can be made into a cochain complex $(C^{\bullet}(\mathcal U, \mathcal F), \delta)$ by defining the coboundary operator $\delta_q : C^q(\mathcal U, \mathcal F) \to C^{q+1}(\mathcal{U}, \mathcal{F})$ by:

$\quad (\delta_q f)(\sigma) := \sum_{j=0}^{q+1} (-1)^j \mathrm{res}^{|\partial_j \sigma|}_{|\sigma|} f (\partial_j \sigma),$

where $\mathrm{res}^{|\partial_j \sigma|}_{|\sigma|}$ is the restriction morphism from $\mathcal F(|\partial_j \sigma|)$ to $\mathcal F(|\sigma|).$ (Notice that ∂_{j}σ ⊆ σ, but |σ| ⊆ |∂_{j}σ|.)

A calculation shows that $\delta_{q+1} \circ \delta_q = 0.$

The coboundary operator is analogous to the exterior derivative of De Rham cohomology, so it sometimes called the differential of the cochain complex.

==== Cocycle ====
A q-cochain is called a q-cocycle if it is in the kernel of $\delta$, hence $Z^q(\mathcal{U}, \mathcal{F}) := \ker ( \delta_q) \subseteq C^q(\mathcal U, \mathcal F)$ is the set of all q-cocycles.

Thus a (q−1)-cochain $f$ is a cocycle if for all q-simplices $\sigma$ the cocycle condition

$$\sum_{j=0}^{q} (-1)^j \mathrm{res}^{|\partial_j \sigma|}_{|\sigma|} f (\partial_j \sigma) = 0$$

holds.

A 0-cocycle $f$ is a collection of local sections of $\mathcal{F}$ satisfying a compatibility relation on every intersecting $A,B\in \mathcal{U}$

$$f(A)|_{A \cap B} = f(B)|_{A \cap B}$$

A 1-cocycle $f$ satisfies for every non-empty $U = A\cap B \cap C$ with $A,B,C \in \mathcal{U}$

$$f(B \cap C)|_U - f(A \cap C)|_U + f(A \cap B)|_U = 0$$

==== Coboundary ====
A q-cochain is called a q-coboundary if it is in the image of $\delta$ and $B^q(\mathcal{U}, \mathcal{F}) := \mathrm{Im} ( \delta_{q-1}) \subseteq C^{q}(\mathcal{U}, \mathcal{F})$ is the set of all q-coboundaries.

For example, a 1-cochain $f$ is a 1-coboundary if there exists a 0-cochain $h$ such that for every intersecting $A,B\in \mathcal{U}$

$$f(A \cap B) = h(A)|_{A \cap B} - h(B)|_{A \cap B}$$

=== Cohomology ===
The Čech cohomology of $\mathcal{U}$ with values in $\mathcal{F}$ is defined to be the cohomology of the cochain complex $(C^{\bullet}(\mathcal{U}, \mathcal{F}), \delta)$. Thus the qth Čech cohomology is given by

$$\check{H}^q(\mathcal{U}, \mathcal{F}) := H^q((C^{\bullet}(\mathcal U, \mathcal F), \delta)) = Z^q(\mathcal{U}, \mathcal{F}) / B^q(\mathcal{U}, \mathcal{F})$$.

The Čech cohomology of X is defined by considering refinements of open covers. If $\mathcal{V}$ is a refinement of $\mathcal{U}$ then there is a map in cohomology $\check{H}^*(\mathcal U,\mathcal F) \to \check{H}^*(\mathcal V,\mathcal F).$ The open covers of X form a directed set under refinement, so the above map leads to a direct system of abelian groups. The Čech cohomology of X with values in $\mathcal{F}$ is defined as the direct limit $\check{H}(X,\mathcal F) := \varinjlim_{\mathcal U} \check{H}(\mathcal U,\mathcal F)$ of this system.

The Čech cohomology of X with coefficients in a fixed abelian group A, denoted $\check{H}(X;A)$, is defined as $\check{H}(X,\mathcal{F}_A)$ where $\mathcal{F}_A$ is the constant sheaf on X determined by A.

A variant of Čech cohomology, called numerable Čech cohomology, is defined as above, except that all open covers considered are required to be numerable: that is, there is a partition of unity {ρ_{i}} such that each support $\{x\mid\rho_i(x)>0\}$ is contained in some element of the cover. If X is paracompact and Hausdorff, then numerable Čech cohomology agrees with the usual Čech cohomology.

== Relation to other cohomology theories ==
If X is homotopy equivalent to a CW complex, then the Čech cohomology $\check{H}^{*}(X;A)$ is naturally isomorphic to the singular cohomology $H^*(X;A) \,$. If X is a differentiable manifold, then $\check{H}^*(X;\R)$ is also naturally isomorphic to the de Rham cohomology; the article on de Rham cohomology provides a brief review of this isomorphism. For less well-behaved spaces, Čech cohomology differs from singular cohomology. For example if X is the closed topologist's sine curve, then $\check{H}^1(X;\Z)=\Z,$ whereas $H^1(X;\Z)=0.$

If X is a differentiable manifold and the cover $\mathcal{U}$ of X is a "good cover" (i.e. all the sets U_{α} are contractible to a point, and all finite intersections of sets in $\mathcal{U}$ are either empty or contractible to a point), then $\check{H}^{*}(\mathcal U;\R)$ is isomorphic to the de Rham cohomology.

If X is compact Hausdorff, then Čech cohomology (with coefficients in a discrete group) is isomorphic to Alexander-Spanier cohomology.

For a presheaf $\mathcal{F}$ on X, let $\mathcal{F}^+$ denote its sheafification. Then we have a natural comparison map

$$\chi: \check{H}^*(X,\mathcal{F}) \to H^*(X,\mathcal{F}^+)$$

from Čech cohomology to sheaf cohomology. If X is paracompact Hausdorff, then $\chi$ is an isomorphism. More generally, $\chi$ is an isomorphism whenever the Čech cohomology of all presheaves on X with zero sheafification vanishes.

== In algebraic geometry ==
Čech cohomology can be defined more generally for objects in a site C endowed with a topology. This applies, for example, to the Zariski site or the etale site of a scheme X. The Čech cohomology with values in some sheaf $\mathcal{F}$ is defined as

$$\check H^n (X, \mathcal{F}) := \varinjlim_{\mathcal U} \check H^n(\mathcal U, \mathcal{F}).$$

where the colimit runs over all coverings (with respect to the chosen topology) of X. Here $\check H^n(\mathcal U, \mathcal F)$ is defined as above, except that the r-fold intersections of open subsets inside the ambient topological space are replaced by the r-fold fiber product

$$\mathcal U^{\times^r_X} := \mathcal U \times_X \dots \times_X \mathcal U.$$

As in the classical situation of topological spaces, there is always a map

$$\check H^n(X, \mathcal F) \rightarrow H^n(X, \mathcal F)$$

from Čech cohomology to sheaf cohomology. It is always an isomorphism in degrees n = 0 and 1, but may fail to be so in general. For the Zariski topology on a Noetherian separated scheme, Čech and sheaf cohomology agree for any quasi-coherent sheaf. For the étale topology, the two cohomologies agree for any étale sheaf on X, provided that any finite set of points of X are contained in some open affine subscheme. This is satisfied, for example, if X is quasi-projective over an affine scheme.

The possible difference between Čech cohomology and sheaf cohomology is a motivation for the use of hypercoverings: these are more general objects than the Čech nerve

$$N_X \mathcal U : \dots \to \mathcal U \times_X \mathcal U \times_X \mathcal U \to \mathcal U \times_X \mathcal U \to \mathcal U.$$

A hypercovering K_{∗} of X is a certain simplicial object in C, i.e., a collection of objects K_{n} together with boundary and degeneracy maps. Applying a sheaf $\mathcal{F}$ to K_{∗} yields a simplicial abelian group $\mathcal{F}(K_\ast)$ whose n-th cohomology group is denoted $H^n(\mathcal F (K_\ast))$. (This group is the same as $\check H^n(\mathcal U, \mathcal F)$ in case K_{∗} equals $N_X \mathcal U$.) Then, it can be shown that there is a canonical isomorphism

$$H^n (X, \mathcal F) \cong \varinjlim_{K_*} H^n(\mathcal F(K_*)),$$

where the colimit now runs over all hypercoverings.

=== Examples ===
The most basic example of Čech cohomology is given by the case where the presheaf $\mathcal{F}$ is a constant sheaf, e.g. $\mathcal{F}=\mathbb{R}$. In such cases, each $q$-cochain $f$ is simply a function which maps every $q$-simplex to $\mathbb{R}$. For example, we calculate the first Čech cohomology with values in $\mathbb{R}$ of the unit circle $X=S^1$. Dividing $X$ into three arcs and choosing sufficiently small open neighborhoods, we obtain an open cover $\mathcal{U}=\{U_0,U_1,U_2\}$ where $U_i \cap U_j \ne \emptyset$ but $U_0 \cap U_1 \cap U_2 = \emptyset$.

Given any 1-cocycle $f$, $\delta f$ is a 2-cochain which takes inputs of the form $(U_i,U_i,U_i),(U_i,U_i,U_j),(U_j,U_i,U_i),(U_i,U_j,U_i)$ where $i \ne j$ (since $U_0 \cap U_1 \cap U_2 = \emptyset$ and hence $(U_i,U_j,U_k)$ is not a 2-simplex for any permutation $\{i,j,k\}=\{1,2,3\}$). The first three inputs give $f(U_i,U_i)=0$; the fourth gives

$$\delta f(U_i,U_j,U_i)=f(U_j,U_i)-f(U_i,U_i)+f(U_i,U_j)=0 \implies f(U_j,U_i)=-f(U_i,U_j).$$

Such a function is fully determined by the values of $f(U_0,U_1),f(U_0,U_2),f(U_1,U_2)$. Thus,

$$Z^1(\mathcal{U},\mathbb{R})=\{f \in C^1(\mathcal{U},\mathbb{R}) : f(U_i,U_i)=0, f(U_j,U_i)=-f(U_i,U_j)\} \cong \mathbb{R}^3.$$

On the other hand, given any 1-coboundary $f = \delta g$, we have

$$\begin{cases}
f(U_i,U_i)=g(U_i)-g(U_i)=0 & (i=0,1,2); \\
f(U_i,U_j)=g(U_j)-g(U_i)=-f(U_j,U_i) & (i \ne j)
\end{cases}$$

However, upon closer inspection we see that $f(U_0,U_1)+f(U_1,U_2)=f(U_0,U_2)$ and hence each 1-coboundary $f$ is uniquely determined by $f(U_0,U_1)$ and $f(U_1,U_2)$. This gives the set of 1-coboundaries:

$$\begin{align}
B^1(\mathcal{U},\mathbb{R})=\{f \in C^1(\mathcal{U},\mathbb{R}) : \ & f(U_i,U_i)=0, f(U_j,U_i)=-f(U_i,U_j), \\
&f(U_0,U_2)=f(U_0,U_1)+f(U_1,U_2)\} \cong \mathbb{R}^2.
\end{align}$$

Therefore, $\check{H}^1(\mathcal{U},\mathbb{R})=Z^1(\mathcal{U},\mathbb{R})/B^1(\mathcal{U},\mathbb{R}) \cong \mathbb{R}$. Since $\mathcal{U}$ is a good cover of $X$, we have $\check{H}^1(X,\mathbb{R}) \cong \mathbb{R}$ by Leray's theorem.

We may also compute the coherent sheaf cohomology of $\Omega^1$ on the projective line $\mathbb{P}^1_\mathbb{C}$ using the Čech complex. Using the cover

$$\mathcal{U} = \{ U_1 = \text{Spec}(\Complex[y]), U_2 = \text{Spec}(\Complex[y^{-1}]) \}$$

we have the following modules from the cotangent sheaf

$$\begin{align}
&\Omega^1(U_1) = \Complex[y]dy \\
&\Omega^1(U_2) = \Complex \left [y^{-1} \right ]dy^{-1}
\end{align}$$

If we take the conventions that $dy^{-1} = -(1/y^2)dy$ then we get the Čech complex

$$0 \to \Complex[y]dy \oplus \Complex \left [y^{-1} \right ]dy^{-1} \xrightarrow{d^0} \Complex \left [y,y^{-1} \right ]dy \to 0$$

Since $d^0$ is injective and the only element not in the image of $d^0$ is $y^{-1}dy$ we get that

$$\begin{align}
&H^1(\mathbb{P}_{\Complex}^1,\Omega^1) \cong \Complex \\
&H^k(\mathbb{P}_{\Complex}^1,\Omega^1) \cong 0 \text{ for } k \neq 1
\end{align}$$
