= Six operations =

Formalism in homological algebra

In mathematics, Grothendieck's six operations, named after Alexander Grothendieck, is a formalism in homological algebra, also known as the six-functor formalism. It originally sprang from the relations in étale cohomology that arise from a morphism of schemes f : X → Y. The basic insight was that many of the elementary facts relating cohomology on X and Y were formal consequences of a small number of axioms. These axioms hold in many cases completely unrelated to the original context, and therefore the formal consequences also hold. The six operations formalism has since been shown to apply to contexts such as D-modules on algebraic varieties, sheaves on locally compact topological spaces, and motives.

== The operations ==
The operations are six functors. Usually these are functors between derived categories and so are actually left and right derived functors.

- the direct image $f_*$
- the inverse image $f^*$
- the proper (or extraordinary) direct image $f_!$
- the proper (or extraordinary) inverse image $f^!$
- internal tensor product
- internal Hom

The functors $f^*$ and $f_*$ form an adjoint functor pair, as do $f_!$ and $f^!$. Similarly, internal tensor product is left adjoint to internal Hom.

== Six operations in étale cohomology ==
Let f : X → Y be a morphism of schemes. The morphism f induces several functors. Specifically, it gives adjoint functors $f^*$ and $f_*$ between the categories of sheaves on X and Y, and it gives the functor $f_!$ of direct image with proper support. In the derived category, Rf_{!} admits a right adjoint $f^!$. Finally, when working with abelian sheaves, there is a tensor product functor ⊗ and an internal Hom functor, and these are adjoint. The six operations are the corresponding functors on the derived category: Lf^{*}, Rf_{*}, Rf_{!}, f^{!}, ⊗^{L}, and RHom.

Suppose that we restrict ourselves to a category of $\ell$-adic torsion sheaves, where $\ell$ is coprime to the characteristic of X and of Y. In SGA 4 III, Grothendieck and Artin proved that if f is smooth of relative dimension d, then $Lf^*$ is isomorphic to f^{!}(−d)[−2d], where (−d) denotes the dth inverse Tate twist and [−2d] denotes a shift in degree by −2d. Furthermore, suppose that f is separated and of finite type. If g : Y′ → Y is another morphism of schemes, if X′ denotes the base change of X by g, and if f′ and g′ denote the base changes of f and g by g and f, respectively, then there exist natural isomorphisms:

$$Lg^* \circ Rf_! \to Rf'_! \circ Lg'^*,$$
$$Rg'_* \circ f'^! \to f^! \circ Rg_*.$$

Again assuming that f is separated and of finite type, for any objects M in the derived category of X and N in the derived category of Y, there exist natural isomorphisms:

$$(Rf_!M) \otimes_Y N \to Rf_!(M \otimes_X Lf^*N),$$
$$\operatorname{RHom}_Y(Rf_! M, N) \to Rf_*\operatorname{RHom}_X(M, f^!N),$$
$$f^!\operatorname{RHom}_Y(M, N) \to \operatorname{RHom}_X(Lf^*M, f^!N).$$

If i is a closed immersion of Z into S with complementary open immersion j, then there is a distinguished triangle in the derived category:

$$Rj_!j^! \to 1 \to Ri_*i^* \to Rj_!j^![1],$$

where the first two maps are the counit and unit, respectively, of the adjunctions. If Z and S are regular, then there is an isomorphism:

$$1_Z(-c)[-2c] \to i^!1_S,$$

where 1_{Z} and 1_{S} are the units of the tensor product operations (which vary depending on which category of $\ell$-adic torsion sheaves is under consideration).

If S is regular and g : X → S, and if K is an invertible object in the derived category on S with respect to ⊗^{L}, then define D_{X} to be the functor RHom(—, g^{!}K). Then, for objects M and M′ in the derived category on X, the canonical maps:

$$M \to D_X(D_X(M)),$$
$$D_X(M \otimes D_X(M')) \to \operatorname{RHom}(M, M'),$$

are isomorphisms. Finally, if f : X → Y is a morphism of S-schemes, and if M and N are objects in the derived categories of X and Y, then there are natural isomorphisms:

$$D_X(f^*N) \cong f^!(D_Y(N)),$$
$$D_X(f^!N) \cong f^*(D_Y(N)),$$
$$D_Y(f_!M) \cong f_*(D_X(M)),$$
$$D_Y(f_*M) \cong f_!(D_X(M)).$$

== See also ==
- Coherent duality
- Grothendieck local duality
- Image functors for sheaves
- Verdier duality
- Change of rings
