= Alexander duality =

Mathematical theory

In mathematics, Alexander duality refers to a duality theory initiated by a result of J. W. Alexander in 1915, and subsequently further developed, particularly by Pavel Alexandrov and Lev Pontryagin. It applies to the homology theory properties of the complement of a subspace X in Euclidean space, a sphere, or another manifold. It is generalized by Spanier–Whitehead duality.

== General statement for spheres ==
Let $X$ be a non-empty compact, locally contractible subspace of the sphere $S^n$ of dimension n. Let $S^n\setminus X$ be the complement of $X$ in $S^n$. Then if $\tilde{H}$ stands for reduced homology or reduced cohomology, with coefficients in a given abelian group, there is an isomorphism

$$\tilde{H}_q(S^n\setminus X) \cong \tilde{H}^{n-q-1}(X)$$

for all $q\ge 0$. Note that we can drop local contractibility as part of the hypothesis if we use reduced Čech cohomology, which is designed to deal with local pathologies.

=== Applications ===
This is useful for computing the cohomology of knot and link complements in $S^3$. Recall that a knot is an embedding $K\colon S^1 \hookrightarrow S^3$ and a link is a disjoint union of knots, such as the Borromean rings. Then, if we write the link/knot as $L$, we have

$$\tilde{H}_q(S^3\setminus L) \cong \tilde{H}^{3-q-1}(L)$$,

giving a method for computing the cohomology groups. In particular the dimension of the cohomology of the complement only depends on the homology of $L$, that is the number of its connected components (or number of strands). For example it is impossible to distinguish a borromean link from a trivial link (i.e. three separated circles). However it is possible to differentiate between different links using multiplicative operations on these cohomology spaces, like cup-products and the Massey products. For example, for the Borromean rings $L$, the homology groups are

$$\begin{align}
\tilde{H}_0(S^3 \setminus L)&\cong \tilde{H}^{2}(L) = 0 \\
\tilde{H}_1(S^3 \setminus L)&\cong \tilde{H}^{1}(L) = \Z^{\oplus 3}\\
\tilde{H}_2(S^3 \setminus L)&\cong \tilde{H}^{0}(L) = \Z^{\oplus 2}\\
\tilde{H}_3(S^3 \setminus L)&\cong 0 \\
\end{align}$$

== Combinatorial Alexander duality ==
Let $X$ be an abstract simplicial complex on a vertex set $V$ of size $n$. The Alexander dual $X^*$ of $X$ is defined as the simplicial complex on $V$ whose faces are complements of non-faces of $X$. That is

$$X^* = \{ \sigma\ \colon\ V \setminus \sigma \not\in X\}$$.

Note that $(X^*)^* = X$.

Alexander duality implies the following combinatorial analog (for reduced homology and cohomology, with coefficients in any given abelian group):

$$\tilde{H}_q(X^*) \cong \tilde{H}^{n-q-3}(X)$$

for all $q\ge 0$. Indeed, this can be deduced by letting $Y \simeq S^{n-2}$ be the $(n-2)$-skeleton of the full simplex on $V$ (that is, $Y$ is the family of all subsets of size at most $n-1$) and showing that the geometric realization $|X^*|$ is homotopy equivalent to $|Y| \setminus |X|$. Björner and Tancer presented an elementary combinatorial proof and summarized a few generalizations.

== Alexander duality for constructible sheaves ==
For smooth manifolds, Alexander duality is a formal consequence of Verdier duality for sheaves of abelian groups. More precisely, if we let $X$ denote a smooth manifold and we let $Y \subset X$ be a closed subspace (such as a subspace representing a cycle, or a submanifold) represented by the inclusion $i\colon Y \hookrightarrow X$, and if $k$ is a field, then if $\mathcal{F} \in \operatorname{Sh}_k(Y)$ is a sheaf of $k$-vector spaces we have the following isomorphism

$$H^s_c(Y,\mathcal{F})^\vee \cong \operatorname{Ext}_k^{n-s}(i_*\mathcal{F}, \omega_X [n-s])$$,

where the cohomology group on the left is compactly supported cohomology. We can unpack this statement further to get a better understanding of what it means. First, if $\mathcal{F} = \underline{k}$ is the constant sheaf and $Y$ is a smooth submanifold, then we get

$$\operatorname{Ext}_k^{n - s}(i_*\mathcal{F}, \omega_X [n-r]) \cong H^{n-s}_Y(X,\omega_X)$$,

where the cohomology group on the right is local cohomology with support in $Y$. Through further reductions, it is possible to identify the homology of $X \setminus Y$ with the cohomology of $Y$. This is useful in algebraic geometry for computing the cohomology groups of projective varieties, and is exploited for constructing a basis of the Hodge structure of hypersurfaces of degree $d$ using the Jacobian ring.

== Alexander's 1915 result ==
Referring to Alexander's original work, it is assumed that X is a simplicial complex.

Alexander had little of the modern apparatus, and his result was only for the Betti numbers, with coefficients taken modulo 2. What to expect comes from examples. For example the Clifford torus construction in the 3-sphere shows that the complement of a solid torus is another solid torus; which will be open if the other is closed, but this does not affect its homology. Each of the solid tori is from the homotopy point of view a circle. If we just write down the Betti numbers

1, 1, 0, 0

of the circle (up to $H_3$, since we are in the 3-sphere), then reverse as

0, 0, 1, 1

and then shift one to the left to get

0, 1, 1, 0

there is a difficulty, since we are not getting what we started with. On the other hand the same procedure applied to the reduced Betti numbers, for which the initial Betti number is decremented by 1, starts with

0, 1, 0, 0

and gives

0, 0, 1, 0

whence

0, 1, 0, 0.

This does work out, predicting the complement's reduced Betti numbers.

The prototype here is the Jordan curve theorem, which topologically concerns the complement of a circle in the Riemann sphere. It also tells the same story. We have the honest Betti numbers

1, 1, 0

of the circle, and therefore

0, 1, 1

by flipping over and

1, 1, 0

by shifting to the left. This gives back something different from what the Jordan theorem states, which is that there are two components, each contractible (Schoenflies theorem, to be accurate about what is used here). That is, the correct answer in honest Betti numbers is

2, 0, 0.

Once more, it is the reduced Betti numbers that work out. With those, we begin with

0, 1, 0

to finish with

1, 0, 0.

From these two examples, therefore, Alexander's formulation can be inferred: reduced Betti numbers $\tilde{b}_i$ are related in complements by

$$\tilde{b}_i \to \tilde{b}_{n-i-1}$$.
