= Grothendieck duality =

In mathematics, Grothendieck duality may refer to:

- Coherent duality of coherent sheaves
- Grothendieck local duality of modules over a local ring
