= Tautness (topology) =

Mathematical concept in algebraic topology

In mathematics, particularly in algebraic topology, a taut pair is a topological pair $(A,B)$, whose cohomology modules $H^{q}(A,B;G)$ are isomorphic to the direct limit of the cohomology modules $H^{q}(U,V;G),$ with $(U,V)$ a pair of open neighborhoods of $(A,B)$, where the direct limit is induced by inclusion.

== Definition ==
For a topological pair $(A,B)$ in a topological space $X$, a neighborhood $(U,V)$ of such a pair is defined to be a pair such that $U$ and $V$ are neighborhoods of $A$ and $B$ respectively.

If we collect all neighborhoods of $(A,B)$, then we can form a directed set which is directed downward by inclusion. Hence its cohomology module $H^q(U,V;G)$ is a direct system where $G$ is a module over a ring with unity. If we denote its direct limit by

$$\bar{H}^q(A,B;G)=\varinjlim H^q(U,V;G)$$

the restriction maps $H^q(U,V;G)\to H^q(A,B;G)$ define a natural homomorphism $i:\bar{H}^q(A,B;G)\to H^q(A,B;G)$.

The pair $(A,B)$ is said to be tautly embedded in $X$ (or a taut pair in $X$) if $i$ is an isomorphism for all $q$ and $G$.

== Basic properties ==
- For pair $(A,B)$ of $X$, if two of the three pairs $(B,\emptyset),(A,\emptyset)$, and $(A,B)$ are taut in $X$, so is the third.
- For pair $(A,B)$ of $X$, if $A,B$ and $X$ have compact triangulation, then $(A,B)$ in $X$ is taut.
- If $U$ varies over the neighborhoods of $A$, there is an isomorphism $\varinjlim \bar{H}^q(U;G)\simeq \bar{H}^q(A;G)$.
- If $(A,B)$ and $(A',B')$ are closed pairs in a normal space $X$, there is an exact relative Mayer-Vietoris sequence for any coefficient module $G$

$$\cdots\to\bar{H}^q(A\cup A',B\cup B')\to\bar{H}^q(A,B)\oplus\bar{H}^q(A',B')\to \bar{H}^q(A\cap A',B\cap B')\to\cdots$$

== Properties related to cohomology theory ==
- Let $A$ be any subspace of a topological space $X$ which is a neighborhood retract of $X$. Then $A$ is a taut subspace of $X$ with respect to Alexander-Spanier cohomology.
- every retract of an arbitrary topological space is a taut subspace of $X$ with respect to Alexander-Spanier cohomology.
- A closed subspace of a paracompactt Hausdorff space is a taut subspace of relative to the Alexander cohomology theory

=== Note ===
Since the Čech cohomology and the Alexander-Spanier cohomology are naturally isomorphic on the category of all topological pairs, all of the above properties are valid for Čech cohomology. However, it's not true for singular cohomology (see Example)

== Dependence of cohomology theory ==
=== Example ===
Let $X$ be the subspace of $\mathbb R^2\subset S^2$ which is the union of four sets

$$A_1 = \{(x,y)\mid x =0,-2\leq y\leq 1\}$$
$$A_2 = \{(x,y)\mid 0\leq x\leq 1,y =-2\}$$
$$A_3 = \{(x,y)\mid x = 1,-2\leq y\leq 0\}$$
$$A_4 =\{(x,y)\mid 0<x\leq 1,y =\sin 2\pi/x\}$$

The first singular cohomology of $X$ is $H^1(X;Z) = 0$ and using the Alexander duality theorem on $S^2-X$, $\varinjlim\{H^q(U;\mathbb Z)\} = \mathbb Z$ as $U$ varies over neighborhoods of $X$.

Therefore, $\varinjlim\{H^q(U;\mathbb Z)\}\to H^1(X;\mathbb Z)$ is not a monomorphism so that $X$ is not a taut subspace of $\mathbb R^2$ with respect to singular cohomology. However, since $X$ is closed in $\mathbb R^2$, it's taut subspace with respect to Alexander cohomology.

== See also ==
- Alexander-Spanier cohomology
- Čech cohomology
