= Faltings' annihilator theorem =

Algebraic theorem

In abstract algebra (specifically commutative ring theory), Faltings' annihilator theorem states: given a finitely generated module M over a Noetherian commutative ring A and ideals I, J, the following are equivalent:

- $\operatorname{depth} M_{\mathfrak{p}} + \operatorname{ht}(I + \mathfrak{p})/\mathfrak{p} \ge n$ for any prime ideal $\mathfrak{p} \in \operatorname{Spec}(A) - V(J)$,
- there is an ideal $\mathfrak b$ in A such that $\mathfrak{b} \supset J$ and $\mathfrak b$ annihilates the local cohomologies $\operatorname{H}^i_I(M), 0 \le i \le n - 1$,

provided either A has a dualizing complex or is a quotient of a regular ring.

The theorem was first proved by Faltings in (Faltings 1981).
