= Reflexive sheaf =

In algebraic geometry, a reflexive sheaf is a coherent sheaf that is isomorphic to its second dual (as a sheaf of modules) via the canonical map. The second dual of a coherent sheaf is called the reflexive hull of the sheaf. A basic example of a reflexive sheaf is a locally free sheaf of finite rank. The notion is important both in scheme theory and complex algebraic geometry.

For the theory of reflexive sheaves, one works over an integral noetherian scheme.

A reflexive sheaf is torsion-free. The dual of a coherent sheaf is reflexive. Usually, the product of reflexive sheaves is defined as the reflexive hull of their tensor products (so the result is reflexive).

A coherent sheaf F is said to be "normal" in the sense of Barth if the restriction $F(U) \to F(U - Y)$ is bijective for every open subset U and a closed subset Y of U of codimension at least 2. With this terminology, a coherent sheaf on an integral normal scheme is reflexive if and only if it is torsion-free and normal in the sense of Barth. A reflexive sheaf of rank one on an integral locally factorial scheme is invertible.

A divisorial sheaf on a scheme X is a rank-one reflexive sheaf that is locally free at the generic points of the conductor D_{X} of X. For example, a canonical sheaf (dualizing sheaf) on a normal projective variety is a divisorial sheaf.

== See also ==
- Torsionless module
- Torsion sheaf
- Twisted sheaf
