= Coherent duality =

Generalisations of Serre duality in mathematics

In mathematics, coherent duality is any of a number of generalisations of Serre duality, applying to coherent sheaves, in algebraic geometry and complex manifold theory, as well as some aspects of commutative algebra that are part of the 'local' theory.

The historical roots of the theory lie in the idea of the adjoint linear system of a linear system of divisors in classical algebraic geometry. This was re-expressed, with the advent of sheaf theory, in a way that made an analogy with Poincaré duality more apparent. Then according to a general principle, Grothendieck's relative point of view, the theory of Jean-Pierre Serre was extended to a proper morphism; Serre duality was recovered as the case of the morphism of a non-singular projective variety (or complete variety) to a point. The resulting theory is now sometimes called Serre–Grothendieck–Verdier duality, and is a basic tool in algebraic geometry. A treatment of this theory, Residues and Duality (1966) by Robin Hartshorne, became a reference. One concrete spin-off was the Grothendieck residue.

To go beyond proper morphisms, as for the versions of Poincaré duality that are not for closed manifolds, requires some version of the compact support concept. This was addressed in SGA2 in terms of local cohomology, and Grothendieck local duality; and subsequently. The Greenlees–May duality, first formulated in 1976 by Ralf Strebel and in 1978 by Eben Matlis, is part of the continuing consideration of this area.

== Adjoint functor point of view ==
While Serre duality uses a line bundle or invertible sheaf as a dualizing sheaf, the general theory (it turns out) cannot be quite so simple. (More precisely, it can, but at the cost of imposing the Gorenstein ring condition.) In a characteristic turn, Grothendieck reformulated general coherent duality as the existence of a right adjoint functor $f^{!}$, called twisted or exceptional inverse image functor, to a higher direct image with compact support functor $Rf_{!}$.

Higher direct images are a sheafified form of sheaf cohomology in this case with proper (compact) support; they are bundled up into a single functor by means of the derived category formulation of homological algebra (introduced with this case in mind). If $f$ is proper, then $Rf_{!} = Rf_{\ast}$ is a right adjoint to the inverse image functor $f^{\ast}$. The existence theorem for the twisted inverse image is the name given to the proof of the existence for what would be the counit for the comonad of the sought-for adjunction, namely a natural transformation

$$Rf_{!}f^{!}\rightarrow id$$,

which is denoted by $Tr_f$ (Hartshorne) or $\int_f$ (Verdier). It is the aspect of the theory closest to the classical meaning, as the notation suggests, that duality is defined by integration.

To be more precise, $f^{!}$ exists as an exact functor from a derived category of quasi-coherent sheaves on $Y$, to the analogous category on $X$, whenever

$$f : X \rightarrow Y$$

is a proper or quasi-projective morphism of noetherian schemes, of finite Krull dimension. From this the rest of the theory can be derived: dualizing complexes pull back via $f^{!}$, the Grothendieck residue symbol, the dualizing sheaf in the Cohen–Macaulay case.

In order to get a statement in more classical language, but still wider than Serre duality, Hartshorne (Algebraic Geometry) uses the Ext functor of sheaves; this is a kind of stepping stone to the derived category.

The classical statement of Grothendieck duality for a projective or proper morphism $f : X \rightarrow Y$ of noetherian schemes of finite dimension, found in Hartshorne (Residues and duality) is the following quasi-isomorphism

$$Rf_{\ast}RHom_X(F^\bullet,f^! G^\bullet)\to RHom_Y(Rf_{\ast}F^\bullet ,G^\bullet)$$

for $F^\bullet$ a bounded above complex of $O_X$-modules with quasi-coherent cohomology and $G^\bullet$ a bounded below complex of $O_Y$-modules with coherent cohomology. Here the $Hom$'s are sheaves of homomorphisms.

== Construction of the f^{!} pseudofunctor using rigid dualizing complexes ==
Over the years, several approaches for constructing the $f^{!}$ pseudofunctor emerged. One quite recent successful approach is based on the notion of a rigid dualizing complex. This notion was first defined by Van den Bergh in a noncommutative context. The construction is based on a variant of derived Hochschild cohomology (Shukla cohomology): Let $k$ be a commutative ring, and let $A$ be a commutative $k-$algebra. There is a functor $RHom_{A\otimes^L_k A}(A,M\otimes^L_k M)$ which takes a cochain complex $M$ to an object $RHom_{A\otimes^L_k A}(A,M\otimes^L_k M)$ in the derived category over $A$.

Assuming $A$ is noetherian, a rigid dualizing complex over $A$ relative to $k$ is by definition a pair $(R,\rho)$ where $R$ is a dualizing complex over $A$ which has finite flat dimension over $k$, and where $\rho: R\to RHom_{A\otimes^L_k A}(A,R\otimes^L_k R)$ is an isomorphism in the derived category $D(A)$. If such a rigid dualizing complex exists, then it is unique in a strong sense.

Assuming $A$ is a localization of a finite type $k$-algebra, existence of a rigid dualizing complex over $A$ relative to $k$ was first proved by Yekutieli and Zhang assuming $k$ is a regular noetherian ring of finite Krull dimension, and by Avramov, Iyengar and Lipman assuming $k$ is a Gorenstein ring of finite Krull dimension and $A$ is of finite flat dimension over $k$.

If $X$ is a scheme of finite type over $k$, one can glue the rigid dualizing complexes that its affine pieces have, and obtain a rigid dualizing complex $R_X$. Once one establishes a global existence of a rigid dualizing complex, given a map $f:X\to Y$ of schemes over $k$, one can define $f^{!} := D_X \circ Lf^* \circ D_Y$, where for a scheme $X$, we set $D_X:= RHom_{\mathcal{O}_X}(-,R_X)$.

== Dualizing complex examples ==
=== Dualizing complex for a projective variety ===
The dualizing complex for a projective variety $X \subset \mathbb{P}^n$ is given by the complex

$$\omega_X^\bullet = \mathrm{RHom}_{\mathbb{P}^n}(\mathcal{O}_X,\omega_{\mathbb{P}^n}[+n])$$

=== Plane intersecting a line ===
Consider the projective variety

$$X = \text{Proj}\left( \frac{\mathbb{C}[x,y,z,w]}{(x)(y,z)} \right) = \text{Proj}\left( \frac{\mathbb{C}[x,y,z,w]}{(xy,xz)} \right)$$

We can compute $\mathrm{RHom}_{\mathbb{P}^3}(\mathcal{O}_X,\omega_{\mathbb{P}^3}[+3])$ using a resolution $\mathcal{L}^\bullet \to \mathcal{O}_X$ by locally free sheaves. This is given by the complex

$$0 \to \mathcal{O}(-3) \xrightarrow{\begin{bmatrix}z \\ -y \end{bmatrix}} \mathcal{O}(-2) \oplus \mathcal{O}(-2) \xrightarrow{\begin{bmatrix}xy & xz \end{bmatrix}} \mathcal{O} \to \mathcal{O}_X \to 0$$

Since $\omega_{\mathbb{P}^3} \cong \mathcal{O}(-4)$ we have that

$$\omega_X^\bullet = \mathrm{RHom}_{\mathbb{P}^3}(\mathcal{L}^\bullet, \mathcal{O}(-4)[+3]) = \mathrm{RHom}_{\mathbb{P}^3}(\mathcal{L}^\bullet\otimes \mathcal{O}(4)[-3], \mathcal{O})$$

This is the complex

$$[\mathcal{O}(-4) \xrightarrow{\begin{bmatrix}xy \\ xz \end{bmatrix}} \mathcal{O}(-2) \oplus \mathcal{O}(-2)
\xrightarrow{\begin{bmatrix}z & -y \end{bmatrix}} \mathcal{O}(-1)][-3]$$

== See also ==
- Verdier duality
