= Gentles =

Gentles is a Scottish surname. Notable people with the surname include:

- James Clark Gentles (1921–1997), Scottish mycologist
- Ryan Gentles (music manager) (born 1977), American music manager
- Ryan Gentles (21st century), American actor
