= Alexander–Spanier cohomology =

Cohomology theory for topological spaces

In mathematics, particularly in algebraic topology, Alexander–Spanier cohomology is a cohomology theory for topological spaces.

== History ==
It was introduced by James W. Alexander (1935) for the special case of compact metric spaces, and by Edwin H. Spanier (1948) for all topological spaces, based on a suggestion of Alexander D. Wallace.

== Definition ==
If X is a topological space and G is an R-module where R is a ring with unity, then there is a cochain complex C whose p-th term $C^p$ is the set of all functions from $X^{p+1}$ to G with differential $d\colon C^{p-1} \to C^{p}$ given by

$$df(x_0,\ldots,x_p)= \sum_i(-1)^if(x_0,\ldots,x_{i-1},x_{i+1},\ldots,x_p).$$

The defined cochain complex $C^*(X;G)$ does not rely on the topology of $X$. In fact, if $X$ is a nonempty space, $G\simeq H^*(C^*(X;G))$ where $G$ is a graded module whose only nontrivial module is $G$ at degree 0.

An element $\varphi\in C^p(X)$ is said to be locally zero if there is a covering $\{U\}$ of $X$ by open sets such that $\varphi$ vanishes on any $(p+1)$-tuple of $X$ which lies in some element of $\{U\}$ (i.e. $\varphi$ vanishes on $\bigcup_{U\in\{U\}}U^{p+1}$). The subset of $C^p(X)$ consisting of locally zero functions is a submodule, denote by $C_0^p(X)$. $C^*_0(X) = \{C_0^p(X),d\}$ is a cochain subcomplex of $C^*(X)$ so we define a quotient cochain complex $\bar{C}^*(X)=C^*(X)/C_0^*(X)$. The Alexander–Spanier cohomology groups $\bar{H}^p(X,G)$ are defined to be the cohomology groups of $\bar{C}^*(X)$.

=== Induced homomorphism ===
Given a function $f:X\to Y$ which is not necessarily continuous, there is an induced cochain map

$$f^\sharp:C^*(Y;G)\to C^*(X;G)$$

defined by $(f^\sharp\varphi)(x_0,...,x_p) = (\varphi f)(x_0,...,x_p),\ \varphi\in C^p(Y);\ x_0,...,x_p\in X$

If $f$ is continuous, there is an induced cochain map

$$f^\sharp:\bar{C}^*(Y;G)\to\bar{C}^*(X;G)$$

=== Relative cohomology module ===
If $A$ is a subspace of $X$ and $i:A\hookrightarrow X$ is an inclusion map, then there is an induced epimorphism $i^\sharp:\bar{C}^*(X;G)\to \bar{C}^*(A;G)$. The kernel of $i^\sharp$ is a cochain subcomplex of $\bar{C}^*(X;G)$ which is denoted by $\bar{C}^*(X,A;G)$. If $C^*(X,A)$ denote the subcomplex of $C^*(X)$ of functions $\varphi$ that are locally zero on $A$, then $\bar{C}^*(X,A) = C^*(X,A)/C^*_0(X)$.

The relative module is $\bar{H}^*(X,A;G)$ is defined to be the cohomology module of $\bar{C}^*(X,A;G)$.

$\bar{H}^q(X,A;G)$ is called the Alexander cohomology module of $(X,A)$ of degree $q$ with coefficients $G$ and this module satisfies all cohomology axioms. The resulting cohomology theory is called the Alexander (or Alexander-Spanier) cohomology theory

== Cohomology theory axioms ==
- (Dimension axiom) If $X$ is a one-point space, $G\simeq \bar{H}^*(X;G)$
- (Exactness axiom) If $(X,A)$ is a topological pair with inclusion maps $i:A\hookrightarrow X$ and $j:X\hookrightarrow (X,A)$, there is an exact sequence
  $$\cdots\to\bar{H}^q(X,A;G) \xrightarrow{j^*} \bar{H}^q(X;G)\xrightarrow{i^*}\bar{H}^q(A;G)\xrightarrow{\delta^*}\bar{H}^{q+1}(X,A;G)\to\cdots$$
- (Excision axiom) For topological pair $(X,A)$, if $U$ is an open subset of $X$ such that $\bar{U}\subset\operatorname{int}A$, then $\bar{C}^*(X,A)\simeq \bar{C}^*(X-U,A-U)$.
- (Homotopy axiom) If $f_0,f_1:(X,A)\to(Y,B)$ are homotopic, then $f_0^* = f_1^*:H^*(Y,B;G)\to H^*(X,A;G)$

== Alexander cohomology with compact supports ==
A subset $B\subset X$ is said to be cobounded if $X-B$ is bounded, i.e. its closure is compact.

Similar to the definition of Alexander cohomology module, one can define Alexander cohomology module with compact supports of a pair $(X,A)$ by adding the property that $\varphi\in C^q(X,A;G)$ is locally zero on some cobounded subset of $X$.

Formally, one can define as follows : For given topological pair $(X,A)$, the submodule $C^q_c(X,A;G)$ of $C^q(X,A;G)$ consists of $\varphi\in C^q(X,A;G)$ such that $\varphi$ is locally zero on some cobounded subset of $X$.

Similar to the Alexander cohomology module, one can get a cochain complex $C^*_c(X,A;G) = \{C^q_c(X,A;G),\delta\}$ and a cochain complex $\bar{C}^*_c(X,A;G) = C^*_c(X,A;G)/C_0^*(X;G)$.

The cohomology module induced from the cochain complex $\bar{C}^*_c$ is called the Alexander cohomology of $(X,A)$ with compact supports and denoted by $\bar{H}^*_c(X,A;G)$. Induced homomorphism of this cohomology is defined as the Alexander cohomology theory.

Under this definition, we can modify homotopy axiom for cohomology to a proper homotopy axiom if we define a coboundary homomorphism $\delta^*:\bar{H}^q_c(A;G)\to \bar{H}^{q+1}_c(X,A;G)$ only when $A\subset X$ is a closed subset. Similarly, excision axiom can be modified to proper excision axiom i.e. the excision map is a proper map.

=== Property ===
One of the most important property of this Alexander cohomology module with compact support is the following theorem:

- If $X$ is a locally compact Hausdorff space and $X^+$ is the one-point compactification of $X$, then there is an isomorphism
  $$\bar{H}^q_c(X;G)\simeq \tilde{\bar{H}}^q(X^+;G).$$

=== Example ===
$$\bar{H}^q_c(\R^n;G)\simeq\begin{cases} 0 & q\neq n\\ G & q = n\end{cases}$$

as $(\R^n)^+\cong S^n$. Hence if $n\neq m$, $\R^n$ and $\R^m$ are not of the same proper homotopy type.

== Relation with tautness ==
- From the fact that a closed subspace of a paracompact Hausdorff space is a taut subspace relative to the Alexander cohomology theory and the first Basic property of tautness, if $B\subset A\subset X$ where $X$ is a paracompact Hausdorff space and $A$ and $B$ are closed subspaces of $X$, then $(A,B)$ is taut pair in $X$ relative to the Alexander cohomology theory.

Using this tautness property, one can show the following two facts:

- (Strong excision property) Let $(X,A)$ and $(Y,B)$ be pairs with $X$ and $Y$ paracompact Hausdorff and $A$ and $B$ closed. Let $f:(X,A)\to(Y,B)$ be a closed continuous map such that $f$ induces a one-to-one map of $X-A$ onto $Y-B$. Then for all $q$ and all $G$,
  $$f^*:\bar{H}^q(Y,B;G)\xrightarrow{\sim}\bar{H}^q(X,A;G)$$
- (Weak continuity property) Let $\{(X_\alpha,A_\alpha)\}_\alpha$ be a family of compact Hausdorff pairs in some space, directed downward by inclusion, and let $(X,A) =(\bigcap X_\alpha,\bigcap A_\alpha)$. The inclusion maps $i_\alpha:(X,A)\to (X_\alpha,A_\alpha)$ induce an isomorphism
  $$\{i^*_\alpha\}:\varinjlim\bar{H}^q(X_\alpha,A_\alpha;M)\xrightarrow{\sim}\bar{H}^q(X,A;M)$$.

== Difference from singular cohomology theory ==
Recall that the singular cohomology module of a space is the direct product of the singular cohomology modules of its path components.

A nonempty space $X$ is connected if and only if $G\simeq \bar{H}^0(X;G)$. Hence for any connected space which is not path connected, singular cohomology and Alexander cohomology differ in degree 0.

If $\{U_j\}$ is an open covering of $X$ by pairwise disjoint sets, then there is a natural isomorphism $\bar{H}^q(X;G)\simeq \prod_j\bar{H}^q(U_j;G)$. In particular, if $\{C_j\}$ is the collection of components of a locally connected space $X$, there is a natural isomorphism $\bar{H}^q(X;G)\simeq \prod_j\bar{H}^q(C_j;G)$.

=== Variants ===
It is also possible to define Alexander–Spanier homology and Alexander–Spanier cohomology with compact supports. (Bredon 1997)

== Connection to other cohomologies ==
The Alexander–Spanier cohomology groups coincide with Čech cohomology groups for compact Hausdorff spaces, and coincide with singular cohomology groups for locally finite complexes.

== Bibliography ==
- Alexander, James W. (1935), "On the Chains of a Complex and Their Duals", Proceedings of the National Academy of Sciences of the United States of America, 21 (8), National Academy of Sciences: 509–511, Bibcode:1935PNAS...21..509A, doi:10.1073/pnas.21.8.509, ISSN 0027-8424, JSTOR 86360, PMC 1076641, PMID 16577676
- Bredon, Glen E. (1997), Sheaf theory, Graduate Texts in Mathematics, vol. 170 (2nd ed.), Berlin, New York: Springer-Verlag, doi:10.1007/978-1-4612-0647-7, ISBN 978-0-387-94905-5, MR 1481706
- Massey, William S. (1978), "How to give an exposition of the Čech-Alexander-Spanier type homology theory", The American Mathematical Monthly, 85 (2): 75–83, doi:10.2307/2321782, ISSN 0002-9890, JSTOR 2321782, MR 0488017
- Massey, William S. (1978), Homology and cohomology theory. An approach based on Alexander-Spanier cochains., Monographs and Textbooks in Pure and Applied Mathematics, vol. 46, New York: Marcel Dekker Inc., ISBN 978-0-8247-6662-7, MR 0488016
- Spanier, Edwin H. (1948), "Cohomology theory for general spaces", Annals of Mathematics, Second Series, 49 (2): 407–427, doi:10.2307/1969289, ISSN 0003-486X, JSTOR 1969289, MR 0024621
- Spanier, Edwin H. (1966), Algebraic topology, Springer, ISBN 978-0387944265
