= Shriek map =

Exceptional functor

In category theory, a branch of mathematics, certain unusual functors are denoted $f_!$ and $f^!,$ with the exclamation mark used to indicate that they are exceptional in some way. They are thus accordingly sometimes called shriek maps, with "shriek" being slang for an exclamation mark, though other terms are used, depending on context.

== Usage ==
Shriek notation is used in two senses:

- To distinguish a functor from a more usual functor $f_*$ or $f^*,$ accordingly as it is covariant or contravariant.
- To indicate a map that goes "the wrong way" – a functor that has the same objects as a more familiar functor, but behaves differently on maps and has the opposite variance. For example, it has a pull-back where one expects a push-forward.

== Examples ==
In algebraic geometry, these arise in image functors for sheaves, particularly Verdier duality, where $f_!$ is a "less usual" functor.

In algebraic topology, these arise particularly in fiber bundles, where they yield maps that have the opposite of the usual variance. They are thus called wrong way maps, umkehr maps, Gysin maps, as they originated in the Gysin sequence, or transfer maps. A fiber bundle $F \to E \to B,$ with base space B, fiber F, and total space E, has, like any other continuous map of topological spaces, a covariant map (pushforward) on homology $H_*(E) \to H_*(B)$ and a contravariant map (pullback) on cohomology $H^*(B) \to H^*(E).$ However, it also has a covariant map on cohomology, corresponding in de Rham cohomology to "integration along the fiber", and a contravariant map on homology, corresponding in de Rham cohomology to "pointwise product with the fiber". The composition of the "wrong way" map with the usual map gives a map from the homology of the base to itself, analogous to a unit/counit of an adjunction; compare also Galois connection.

These can be used in understanding and proving the product property for the Euler characteristic of a fiber bundle.
