= Twisted sheaf =

In mathematics, a twisted sheaf is a variant of a coherent sheaf. Precisely, it is specified by: an open covering in the étale topology U_{i}, coherent sheaves F_{i} over U_{i}, a Čech 2-cocycle θ for $\mathbb{G}_m$ on the covering U_{i} as well as the isomorphisms

$$g_{ij}: F_j|_{U_{ij}} \overset{\sim}\to F_i|_{U_{ij}}$$

satisfying

- $g_{ii} = \operatorname{id}_{F_i}$,
- $g_{ij} = g_{ji}^{-1},$
- $g_{ij} \circ g_{jk} \circ g_{ki} = \theta_{ijk} \operatorname{id}_{F_i}.$

The notion of twisted sheaves was introduced by Jean Giraud. The above definition due to Căldăraru is down-to-earth but is equivalent to a more sophisticated definition in terms of gerbe; see § 2.1.3 of (Lieblich 2007).

== See also ==
- Reflexive sheaf
- Torsion sheaf
