= Compactly supported homology =

Type of homology theory in algebraic topology

In mathematics, a homology theory in algebraic topology is compactly supported if, in every degree n, the relative homology group H_{n}(X, A) of every pair of spaces

(X, A)

is naturally isomorphic to the direct limit of the nth relative homology groups of pairs (Y, B), where Y varies over compact subspaces of X and B varies over compact subspaces of A.

Singular homology is compactly supported, since each singular chain is a finite sum of simplices, which are compactly supported. Strong homology is not compactly supported.

If one has defined a homology theory over compact pairs, it is possible to extend it into a compactly supported homology theory in the wider category of Hausdorff pairs (X, A) with A closed in X, by defining that the homology of a Hausdorff pair (X, A) is the direct limit over pairs (Y, B), where Y, B are compact, Y is a subset of X, and B is a subset of A.
