= Francis Sowerby Macaulay =

English mathematician

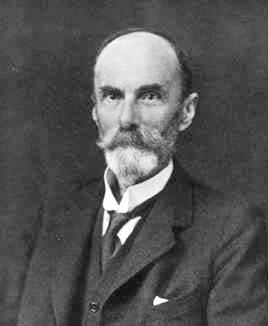
- Born: Francis Sowerby Macaulay; 11 February 1862; Witney
- Died: 9 February 1937 (aged 74); Cambridge
- Known for: Macaulay duality Macaulay matrix Macaulay representation Macaulay's resultant Cohen–Macaulay ring
- Awards: FRS (1928)
- Scientific career
- Fields: Mathematics

Francis Sowerby Macaulay FRS (11 February 1862, Witney – 9 February 1937, Cambridge) was an English mathematician who made significant contributions to algebraic geometry. He is known for his 1916 book The Algebraic Theory of Modular Systems (an old term for ideals), which greatly influenced the later course of commutative algebra. Cohen–Macaulay rings, Macaulay duality, the Macaulay resultant and the Macaulay and Macaulay2 computer algebra systems are named for Macaulay.

Macaulay was educated at Kingswood School and graduated with distinction from St John's College, Cambridge. He taught the top mathematics class in St Paul's School in London from 1885 to 1911. His students included J. E. Littlewood and G. N. Watson.

In 1928 Macaulay was elected Fellow of the Royal Society.

== Publications ==
- MacAulay, F. S. (1902), "Some Formulæ in Elimination", Proc. London Math. Soc., 35: 3–27, doi:10.1112/plms/s1-35.1.3
- Macaulay, Francis Sowerby (1916), The Algebraic Theory of Modular Systems, The Cornell Library of Historical Mathematical Monographs, Cambridge University Press. ISBN 978-1275570412

== See also ==
- Gorenstein ring
