= Edwin Spanier =

American mathematician (1921–1996)

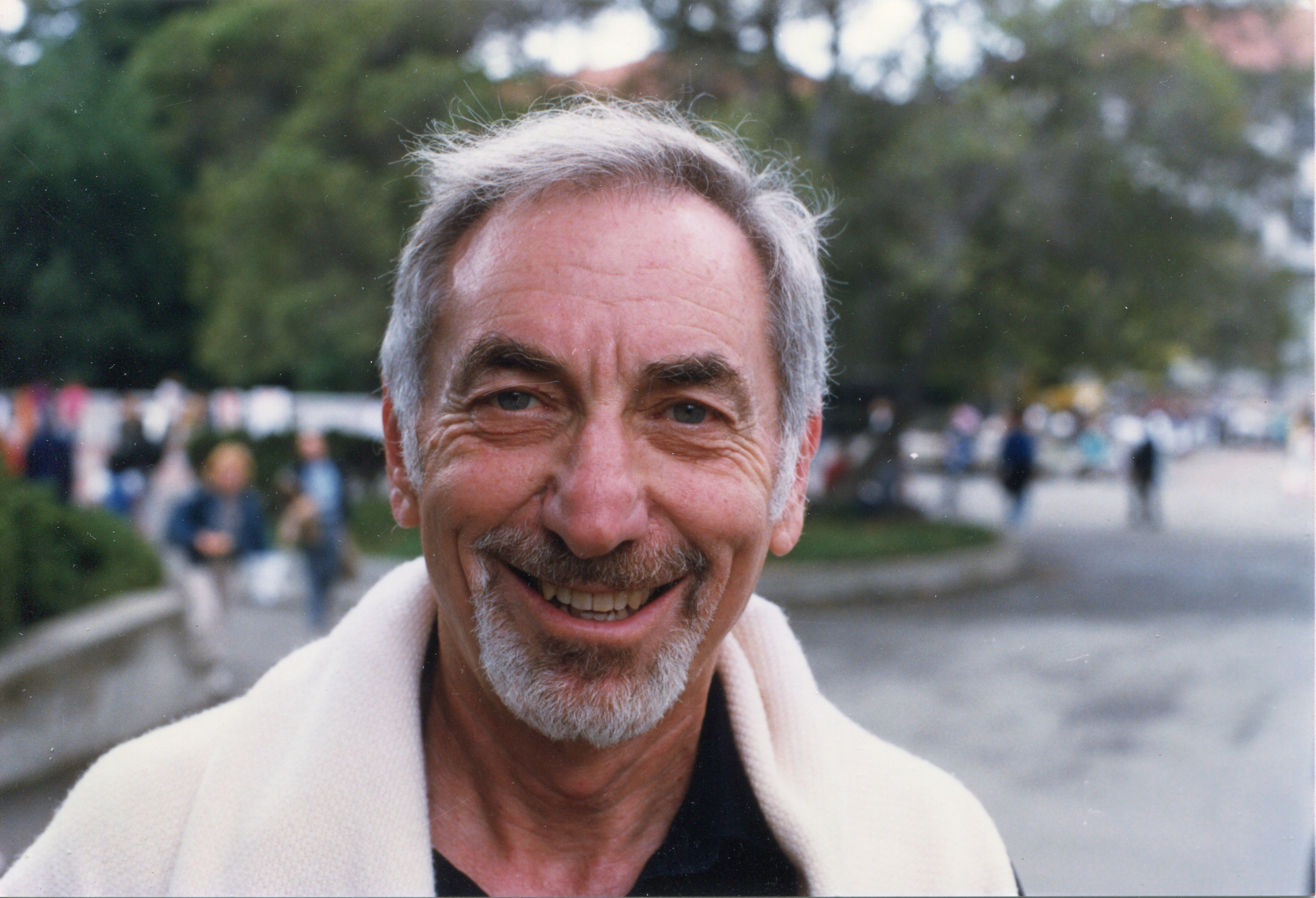
- Spanier in 1986
- Born: August 8, 1921; Washington, D.C.
- Died: October 11, 1996 (aged 75); Scottsdale, Arizona
- Education: University of Michigan (Ph.D.); University of Minnesota
- Known for: Alexander–Spanier cohomology Dubins–Spanier theorems Spanier–Whitehead duality
- Scientific career
- Fields: Mathematics
- Workplaces: UC Berkeley; University of Chicago
- Thesis: Cohomology Theory for General Spaces (1947)
- Doctoral advisor: Norman Steenrod
- Doctoral students: Morris William Hirsch; Elon Lages Lima

Edwin Henry Spanier (August 8, 1921 – October 11, 1996) was an American mathematician at the University of California at Berkeley, working in algebraic topology. He co-invented Spanier–Whitehead duality and Alexander–Spanier cohomology, and wrote what was for a long time the standard textbook on algebraic topology (Spanier 1981).

Spanier attended the University of Minnesota, graduating in 1941. During World War II, he served in the United States Army Signal Corps. He received his Ph.D. degree from the University of Michigan in 1947 for the thesis Cohomology Theory for General Spaces written under the direction of Norman Steenrod. After spending a year as a research fellow at the Institute for Advanced Study in Princeton, New Jersey, in 1948 he was appointed to the faculty of the University of Chicago, and then a professor at UC Berkeley in 1959. He had 17 doctoral students, including Morris Hirsch and Elon Lages Lima.

== Publications ==
- Spanier, Edwin H. (1981) [first published in 1966], Algebraic topology. Corrected reprint, New York-Berlin: Springer-Verlag, pp. xvi+528, ISBN 0-387-90646-0, MR 0666554
