= Carl Hamilton Browning =

Scottish bacteriologist and immunologist

- Born: 21 May 1881; Glasgow, Scotland
- Died: 22 January 1972 (aged 90); Glasgow, Scotland
- Citizenship: British
- Spouse: Isabella Paterson Murdoch (d. 1957) (m. 1909; 3 children)
- Children: Paul, Pauline, Rosalind
- Awards: Cameron Prize for Therapeutics of the University of Edinburgh (1936)
- Scientific career
- Fields: immunology, bacteriology

Carl Hamilton Browning LLD FRS FRSE (21 May 1881–22 January 1972) was a Scottish bacteriologist and immunologist. He is especially remembered for his important work in Germany with Paul Ehrlich. He discovered the therapeutic qualities of acridine dyes.

== Life ==
He was born on 21 May 1881 the son of Friederike Sophia Pauline (née Schmeltzer 1851–1895) and Hugh Hamilton Browning (1845–1927), a schoolmaster. He studied at Glasgow Academy where he excelled becoming the Dux and receiving medals in classics, English and mathematics. He then went to the University of Glasgow from 1900 to 1907 where he graduated in medicine. Using a combination of Coats scholarship and election as a Carnegie Fellow he travelled to Frankfurt-am-Main in Germany for two years of study at the Paul Ehrlich Institute, 1905 to 1907.

In 1908 he began lecturing in bacteriology at the University of Glasgow, working under Prof Robert Muir. As a result of his prestigious research in Germany, in 1911 he was appointed director of the clinical laboratory at the Western Infirmary in Glasgow, aged 30. During the First World War he was appointed to the Bland-Sutton Institute of Pathology at the Middlesex Hospital. During the war he also obtained a professorship in bacteriology at London University. After the war he returned to his home city of Glasgow and was professor of bacteriology at the University of Glasgow (known as the Gardiner Chair) until retirement in 1951.

In 1935 the University of St Andrews awarded him an Honorary Doctor of Letters (LLD). In 1936 the University of Edinburgh awarded him the Cameron Prize for Therapeutics, based for his work on chemotherapy .

In 1947 Browning created a section specialising in medical mycology (fungal diseases in humans) at his Department in Glasgow’s Western Infirmary. He entrusted the running of this section to James Clark Gentles (1921-1997). Browning specifically chose Gentles as a botanist, rather than a doctor, realising the importance of recognising different species of fungus.

He was elected a Fellow of the Royal Society in 1928 and a Fellow of the Royal Society of Edinburgh in 1945.

He died in Glasgow on 22 January 1972.

Browning was sculpted by Benno Schotz in 1950. The bust is now in the museum collection of the Royal College of Physicians and Surgeons of Glasgow.

== Family ==
In 1909 he married Isabella Paterson Murdoch (?–1957) the younger sister of Mary Murdoch, his father's second wife. They had two daughters: Pauline Browning (1915–2012), who married Hubert Frederick 'Eric' Dovaston PhD (1916–1967) known as a plant collector; and Rosalind Browning (1926–1993), who married Prof Manuel Antonio de Jesús Alvarado (1919–2011), a Guatemalan musician and then conductor at the Conservatoire in Guatemala City, and one son Paul Browning (1910–?),

== See also ==
- List of fellows of the Royal Society elected in 1928
- List of fellows of the Royal Society A, B, C
