= Matlis duality =

Theorem in algebra

In algebra, Matlis duality is a duality between Artinian and Noetherian modules over a complete Noetherian local ring. In the special case when the local ring contains a field mapping to the residue field it is closely related to earlier work by Francis Sowerby Macaulay on polynomial rings and is sometimes called Macaulay duality, and the general case was introduced by Matlis (1958).

== Statement ==
Suppose that R is a Noetherian complete local ring with residue field k, and choose E to be an injective hull of k (sometimes called a Matlis module). The dual D_{R}(M) of a module M is defined to be Hom_{R}(M,E). Then Matlis duality states that the duality functor D_{R} gives an anti-equivalence between the categories of Artinian and Noetherian R-modules. In particular the duality functor gives an anti-equivalence from the category of finite-length modules to itself.

== Examples ==
Suppose that the Noetherian complete local ring R has a subfield k that maps onto a subfield of finite index of its residue field R/m. Then the Matlis dual of any R-module is just its dual as a topological vector space over k, if the module is given its m-adic topology. In particular the dual of R as a topological vector space over k is a Matlis module. This case is closely related to work of Macaulay on graded polynomial rings and is sometimes called Macaulay duality.

If R is a discrete valuation ring with quotient field K then the Matlis module is K/R. In the special case when R is the ring of p-adic numbers, the Matlis dual of a finitely-generated module is the Pontryagin dual of it considered as a locally compact abelian group.

If R is a Cohen–Macaulay local ring of dimension d with dualizing module Ω, then the Matlis module is given by the local cohomology group H^{d}_{R}(Ω). In particular if R is an Artinian local ring then the Matlis module is the same as the dualizing module.

== Explanation using adjoint functors ==
Matlis duality can be conceptually explained using the language of adjoint functors and derived categories: the functor between the derived categories of R- and k-modules induced by regarding a k-module as an R-module, admits a right adjoint (derived internal Hom)

$$D(k) \gets D(R) : R\operatorname{Hom}_R(k, -).$$

This right adjoint sends the injective hull $E(k)$ mentioned above to k, which is a dualizing object in $D(k)$. This abstract fact then gives rise to the above-mentioned equivalence.

== See also ==
- Grothendieck local duality
