= List of fellows of the Royal Society elected in 1928 =

This is a list of people elected Fellow of the Royal Society in 1928.

== Fellows ==
- Gleb Anrep
- Harry Bateman
- Carl Hamilton Browning
- Stanley Smith Cook
- William David Dye
- Clinton Coleridge Farr
- Major Greenwood
- Sir Walter Norman Haworth
- John William Heslop-Harrison
- David Keilin
- Finlay Lorimer Kitchin
- Francis Sowerby Macaulay
- Samuel Barnett Schryver
- Walter Stiles
- Robert Whytlaw-Gray

== Foreign members ==
- Albert Auguste Toussaint Brachet
- David Hilbert
- Paul Langevin
- Richard Friedrich Johannes Pfeiffer
- Ludwig Prandtl
- Richard Willstatter

== Statute 12 fellows ==
- Sir William Symington McCormick
- Alfred Moritz Mond, 1st Baron Melchett
