= Exceptional inverse image functor =

In mathematics, more specifically sheaf theory, a branch of topology and algebraic geometry, the exceptional inverse image functor is the fourth and most sophisticated in a series of image functors for sheaves. It is needed to express Verdier duality in its most general form.

== Definition ==
Let f: X → Y be a continuous map of topological spaces or a morphism of schemes. Then the exceptional inverse image is a functor

Rf^{!}: D(Y) → D(X)

where D(–) denotes the derived category of sheaves of abelian groups or modules over a fixed ring.

It is defined to be the right adjoint of the total derived functor Rf_{!} of the direct image with compact support. Its existence follows from certain properties of Rf_{!} and general theorems about existence of adjoint functors, as does the unicity.

The notation Rf^{!} is an abuse of notation insofar as there is in general no functor f^{!} whose derived functor would be Rf^{!}.

== Examples and properties ==
- If f: X → Y is an immersion of a locally closed subspace, then it is possible to define

f^{!}(F) := f^{∗} G,

where G is the subsheaf of F of which the sections on some open subset U of Y are the sections s ∈ F(U) whose support is contained in X. The functor f^{!} is left exact, and the above Rf^{!}, whose existence is guaranteed by abstract nonsense, is indeed the derived functor of this f^{!}. Moreover f^{!} is right adjoint to f_{!}, too.

- Slightly more generally, a similar statement holds for any quasi-finite morphism such as an étale morphism.
- If f is an open immersion, the exceptional inverse image equals the usual inverse image.

== Duality of the exceptional inverse image functor ==
Let $X$ be a smooth manifold of dimension $d$ and let $f: X \rightarrow *$ be the unique map which maps everything to one point. For a ring $\Lambda$, one finds that $f^{!} \Lambda=\omega_{X, \Lambda}[d]$ is the shifted $\Lambda$-orientation sheaf.

On the other hand, let $X$ be a smooth $k$-variety of dimension $d$. If $f: X \rightarrow \operatorname{Spec}(k)$ denotes the structure morphism then $f^{!} k \cong \omega_{X}[d]$ is the shifted canonical sheaf on $X$.

Moreover, let $X$ be a smooth $k$-variety of dimension $d$ and $\ell$ a prime invertible in $k$. Then $f^{!} \mathbb{Q}_{\ell} \cong \mathbb{Q}_{\ell}(d)[2 d]$ where $(d)$ denotes the Tate twist.

Recalling the definition of the compactly supported cohomology as lower-shriek pushforward and noting that below the last $\mathbb{Q}_{\ell}$ means the constant sheaf on $X$ and the rest mean that on $*$, $f:X\to *$, and

$$\mathrm{H}_{c}^{n}(X)^{*} \cong \operatorname{Hom}\left(f_! f^{*} \mathbb{Q}_{\ell}[n], \mathbb{Q}_{\ell}\right) \cong \operatorname{Hom}\left(\mathbb{Q}_{\ell}, f_{*} f^{!} \mathbb{Q}_{\ell}[-n]\right),$$

the above computation furnishes the $\ell$-adic Poincaré duality

$$\mathrm{H}_{c}^{n}\left(X ; \mathbb{Q}_{\ell}\right)^{*} \cong \mathrm{H}^{2 d-n}(X ; \mathbb{Q}(d))$$

from the repeated application of the adjunction condition.
