= Main theorem of elimination theory =

Theorem in algebraic geometry

In algebraic geometry, the main theorem of elimination theory states that every projective scheme is proper. A version of this theorem predates the existence of scheme theory. It can be stated, proved, and applied in the following more classical setting. Let k be a field, denote by $\mathbb{P}_k^n$ the n-dimensional projective space over k. The main theorem of elimination theory is the statement that for any n and any algebraic variety V defined over k, the projection map $V \times \mathbb{P}_k^n \to V$ sends Zariski-closed subsets to Zariski-closed subsets.

The main theorem of elimination theory is a corollary and a generalization of Macaulay's theory of multivariate resultant. The resultant of n homogeneous polynomials in n variables is the value of a polynomial function of the coefficients, which takes the value zero if and only if the polynomials have a common non-trivial zero over some field containing the coefficients.

This belongs to elimination theory, as computing the resultant amounts to eliminating variables between polynomial equations. In fact, given a system of polynomial equations, which is homogeneous in some variables, the resultant eliminates these homogeneous variables by providing an equation in the other variables, which has, as solutions, the values of these other variables in the solutions of the original system.

== A simple motivating example ==
The affine plane over a field k is the direct product $A_2=L_x\times L_y$ of two copies of k. Let

$$\pi\colon L_x\times L_y \to L_x$$

be the projection

$$(x,y)\mapsto \pi(x,y)=x.$$

This projection is not closed for the Zariski topology (nor for the usual topology if $k= \R$ or $k= \C$), because the image by $\pi$ of the hyperbola H of equation $xy-1=0$ is $L_x\setminus \{0\},$ which is not closed, although H is closed, being an algebraic variety.

If one extends $L_y$ to a projective line $P_y,$ the equation of the projective completion of the hyperbola becomes

$$xy_1-y_0=0,$$

and contains

$$\overline\pi(0,(1,0))=0,$$

where $\overline\pi$ is the prolongation of $\pi$ to $L_x\times P_y.$

This is commonly expressed by saying the origin of the affine plane is the projection of the point of the hyperbola that is at infinity, in the direction of the y-axis.

More generally, the image by $\pi$ of every algebraic set in $L_x\times L_y$ is either a finite number of points, or $L_x$ with a finite number of points removed, while the image by $\overline\pi$ of any algebraic set in $L_x\times P_y$ is either a finite number of points or the whole line $L_y.$ It follows that the image by $\overline\pi$ of any algebraic set is an algebraic set, that is that $\overline\pi$ is a closed map for Zariski topology.

The main theorem of elimination theory is a wide generalization of this property.

== Classical formulation ==
For stating the theorem in terms of commutative algebra, one has to consider a polynomial ring $R[\mathbf x]=R[x_1, \ldots, x_n]$ over a commutative Noetherian ring R, and a homogeneous ideal I generated by homogeneous polynomials $f_1,\ldots, f_k.$ (In the original proof by Macaulay, k was equal to n, and R was a polynomial ring over the integers, whose indeterminates were all the coefficients of the$f_i\mathrm s.$)

Any ring homomorphism $\varphi$ from R into a field K, defines a ring homomorphism $R[\mathbf x] \to K[\mathbf x]$ (also denoted $\varphi$), by applying $\varphi$ to the coefficients of the polynomials.

The theorem is: there is an ideal $\mathfrak r$ in R, uniquely determined by I, such that, for every ring homomorphism $\varphi$ from R into a field K, the homogeneous polynomials $\varphi(f_1),\ldots, \varphi(f_k)$ have a nontrivial common zero (in an algebraic closure of K) if and only if $\varphi(\mathfrak r)=\{0\}.$

Moreover, $\mathfrak r =0$ if k < n, and $\mathfrak r$ is principal if k = n. In this latter case, a generator of $\mathfrak r$ is called the resultant of $f_1,\ldots, f_k.$

== Hints for a proof and related results ==
Using above notation, one has first to characterize the condition that $\varphi(f_1),\ldots, \varphi(f_k)$ do not have any non-trivial common zero. This is the case if the maximal homogeneous ideal $\mathfrak m = \langle x_1, \ldots, x_n\rangle$ is the only homogeneous prime ideal containing $\varphi(I)=\langle \varphi(f_1),\ldots, \varphi(f_k)\rangle.$ Hilbert's Nullstellensatz asserts that this is the case if and only if $\varphi(I)$ contains a power of each $x_i,$ or, equivalently, that $\mathfrak m^d \subseteq \varphi(I)$ for some positive integer d.

For this study, Macaulay introduced a matrix that is now called Macaulay matrix in degree d. Its rows are indexed by the monomials of degree d in $x_1, \ldots, x_n,$ and its columns are the vectors of the coefficients on the monomial basis of the polynomials of the form $m\varphi(f_i),$ where m is a monomial of degree $d-\deg(f_i).$ One has $\mathfrak m^d \subseteq \varphi(I)$ if and only if the rank of the Macaulay matrix equals the number of its rows.

If k < n, the rank of the Macaulay matrix is lower than the number of its rows for every d, and, therefore, $\varphi(f_1),\ldots, \varphi(f_k)$ have always a non-trivial common zero.

Otherwise, let $d_i$ be the degree of $f_i,$ and suppose that the indices are chosen in order that $d_2\ge d_3 \ge\cdots\ge d_k\ge d_1.$ The degree

$$D= d_1+d_2+\cdots+d_n-n+1 = 1+\sum_{i=1}^n (d_i-1)$$

is called Macaulay's degree or Macaulay's bound because Macaulay's has proved that $\varphi(f_1),\ldots, \varphi(f_k)$ have a non-trivial common zero if and only if the rank of the Macaulay matrix in degree D is lower than the number to its rows. In other words, the above d may be chosen once for all as equal to D.

Therefore, the ideal $\mathfrak r,$ whose existence is asserted by the main theorem of elimination theory, is the zero ideal if k < n, and, otherwise, is generated by the maximal minors of the Macaulay matrix in degree D.

If k = n, Macaulay has also proved that $\mathfrak r$ is a principal ideal (although Macaulay matrix in degree D is not a square matrix when k > 2), which is generated by the resultant of $\varphi(f_1),\ldots, \varphi(f_n).$ This ideal is also generically a prime ideal, as it is prime if R is the ring of integer polynomials with the all coefficients of $\varphi(f_1),\ldots, \varphi(f_k)$ as indeterminates.

== Geometrical interpretation ==
In the preceding formulation, the polynomial ring $R[\mathbf x]=R[x_1, \ldots, x_n]$ defines a morphism of schemes (which are algebraic varieties if R is finitely generated over a field)

$$\mathbb{P}^{n-1}_R = \operatorname{Proj}(R[\mathbf x]) \to \operatorname{Spec}(R).$$

The theorem asserts that the image of the Zariski-closed set V(I) defined by I is the closed set V(r). Thus the morphism is closed.

== See also ==
- Elimination of quantifiers
- Macaulay's resultant
- Gröbner basis
