= Dualizing module =

In abstract algebra, a dualizing module, also called a canonical module, is a module over a commutative ring that is analogous to the canonical bundle of a smooth variety. It is used in Grothendieck local duality.

== Definition ==
A dualizing module for a Noetherian ring R is a finitely generated module M such that for any maximal ideal m, the R/m vector space Ext^{n}_{R}(R/m,M) vanishes if n ≠ height(m) and is 1-dimensional if n = height(m).

A dualizing module need not be unique because the tensor product of any dualizing module with a rank 1 projective module is also a dualizing module. However this is the only way in which the dualizing module fails to be unique: given any two dualizing modules, one is isomorphic to the tensor product of the other with a rank 1 projective module. In particular if the ring is local the dualizing module is unique up to isomorphism.

A Noetherian ring does not necessarily have a dualizing module. Any ring with a dualizing module must be Cohen–Macaulay. Conversely if a Cohen–Macaulay ring is a quotient of a Gorenstein ring then it has a dualizing module. In particular any complete local Cohen–Macaulay ring has a dualizing module. For rings without a dualizing module it is sometimes possible to use the dualizing complex as a substitute.

== Examples ==
If R is a Gorenstein ring, then R considered as a module over itself is a dualizing module.

If R is an Artinian local ring then the Matlis module of R (the injective hull of the residue field) is the dualizing module.

The Artinian local ring R = k[x,y]/(x^{2},y^{2},xy) has a unique dualizing module, but it is not isomorphic to R.

The ring Z[√–5] has two non-isomorphic dualizing modules, corresponding to the two classes of invertible ideals.

The local ring k[x,y]/(y^{2},xy) is not Cohen–Macaulay so does not have a dualizing module.

== See also ==
- dualizing sheaf
