= Grothendieck local duality =

In commutative algebra, Grothendieck local duality is a duality theorem for cohomology of modules over local rings, analogous to Serre duality of coherent sheaves.

== Statement ==
Suppose that R is a Cohen–Macaulay local ring of dimension d with maximal ideal m and residue field k = R/m. Let E(k) be a Matlis module, an injective hull of k, and let Ω̅ be the completion of its dualizing module. Then for any R-module M there is an isomorphism of modules over the completion of R:

$$\operatorname{Ext}_R^i(M,\overline\Omega) \cong \operatorname{Hom}_R(H_m^{d-i}(M),E(k))$$

where H_{m} is a local cohomology group.

There is a generalization to Noetherian local rings that are not Cohen–Macaulay, that replaces the dualizing module with a dualizing complex.

== See also ==
- Matlis duality
