= Dualizing sheaf =

Concept from algebraic geometry

In algebraic geometry, the dualizing sheaf on a proper scheme X of dimension n over a field k is a coherent sheaf $\omega_X$ together with a linear functional

$$t_X: \operatorname{H}^n(X, \omega_X) \to k$$

that induces a natural isomorphism of vector spaces

$$\operatorname{Hom}_X(F, \omega_X) \simeq \operatorname{H}^n(X, F)^*, \, \varphi \mapsto t_X \circ \varphi$$

for each coherent sheaf F on X (the superscript * refers to a dual vector space). The linear functional $t_X$ is called a trace morphism.

A pair $(\omega_X, t_X)$, if it is exists, is unique up to a natural isomorphism. In fact, in the language of category theory, $\omega_X$ is an object representing the contravariant functor $F \mapsto \operatorname{H}^n(X, F)^*$ from the category of coherent sheaves on X to the category of k-vector spaces.

For a normal projective variety X, the dualizing sheaf exists and it is in fact the canonical sheaf: $\omega_X = \mathcal{O}_X(K_X)$ where $K_X$ is a canonical divisor. More generally, the dualizing sheaf exists for any projective scheme.

There is the following variant of Serre's duality theorem: for a projective scheme X of pure dimension n and a Cohen–Macaulay sheaf F on X such that $\operatorname{Supp}(F)$ is of pure dimension n, there is a natural isomorphism

$$\operatorname{H}^i(X, F) \simeq \operatorname{H}^{n-i}(X, \operatorname{\mathcal{H}om}(F, \omega_X))^*$$.

In particular, if X itself is a Cohen–Macaulay scheme, then the above duality holds for any locally free sheaf.

== Relative dualizing sheaf ==
Given a proper finitely presented morphism of schemes $f: X \to Y$, (Kleiman 1980) defines the relative dualizing sheaf $\omega_f$ or $\omega_{X/Y}$ as the sheaf such that for each open subset $U \subset Y$ and a quasi-coherent sheaf $F$ on $U$, there is a canonical isomorphism

$$(f|_U)^! F = \omega_f \otimes_{\mathcal{O}_Y} F$$,

which is functorial in $F$ and commutes with open restrictions.

Example: If $f$ is a local complete intersection morphism between schemes of finite type over a field, then (by definition) each point of $X$ has an open neighborhood $U$ and a factorization $f|_U: U \overset{i}\to Z \overset{\pi}\to Y$, a regular embedding of codimension $k$ followed by a smooth morphism of relative dimension $r$. Then

$$\omega_f |_U \simeq \wedge^r i^* \Omega^1_{\pi} \otimes \wedge^k N_{U/Z}$$

where $\Omega^1_{\pi}$ is the sheaf of relative Kähler differentials and $N_{U/Z}$ is the normal bundle to $i$.

== Examples ==
=== Dualizing sheaf of a nodal curve ===
For a smooth curve C, its dualizing sheaf $\omega_C$ can be given by the canonical sheaf $\Omega^1_C$.

For a nodal curve C with a node p, we may consider the normalization $\pi:\tilde C\to C$ with two points x, y identified. Let $\Omega_{\tilde C}(x+y)$ be the sheaf of rational 1-forms on $\tilde C$ with possible simple poles at x and y, and let $\Omega_{\tilde C}(x+y)_0$ be the subsheaf consisting of rational 1-forms with the sum of residues at x and y equal to zero. Then the direct image $\pi_*\Omega_{\tilde C}(x+y)_0$ defines a dualizing sheaf for the nodal curve C. The construction can be easily generalized to nodal curves with multiple nodes.

This is used in the construction of the Hodge bundle on the compactified moduli space of curves: it allows us to extend the relative canonical sheaf over the boundary which parametrizes nodal curves. The Hodge bundle is then defined as the direct image of a relative dualizing sheaf.

=== Dualizing sheaf of projective schemes ===
As mentioned above, the dualizing sheaf exists for all projective schemes. For X a closed subscheme of P^{n} of codimension r, its dualizing sheaf can be given as $\mathcal{Ext}^r_{\mathbf{P}^n}(\mathcal{O}_X,\omega_{\mathbf{P}^n})$. In other words, one uses the dualizing sheaf on the ambient P^{n} to construct the dualizing sheaf on X.

== See also ==
- coherent duality
- reflexive sheaf
- Gorenstein ring
- Dualizing module
