= Image functors for sheaves =

In mathematics, especially in sheaf theory—a domain applied in areas such as topology, logic and algebraic geometry—there are four image functors for sheaves that belong together in various senses.

Given a continuous mapping f: X → Y of topological spaces, and the category Sh(–) of sheaves of abelian groups on a topological space. The functors in question are

- direct image f_{∗} : Sh(X) → Sh(Y)
- inverse image f^{∗} : Sh(Y) → Sh(X)
- direct image with compact support f_{!} : Sh(X) → Sh(Y)
- exceptional inverse image Rf^{!} : D(Sh(Y)) → D(Sh(X)).

The exclamation mark is often pronounced "shriek" (slang for exclamation mark), and the maps called "f shriek" or "f lower shriek" and "f upper shriek"—see also shriek map.

The exceptional inverse image is in general defined on the level of derived categories only. Similar considerations apply to étale sheaves on schemes.

== Adjointness ==
The functors are adjoint to each other as depicted at the right, where, as usual, $F \leftrightarrows G$ means that F is left adjoint to G (equivalently G right adjoint to F), i.e.

Hom(F(A), B) ≅ Hom(A, G(B))

for any two objects A, B in the two categories being adjoint by F and G.

For example, f^{∗} is the left adjoint of f_{*}. By the standard reasoning with adjointness relations, there are natural unit and counit morphisms $\mathcal{G} \rightarrow f_*f^{*}\mathcal{G}$ and $f^{*}f_*\mathcal{F} \rightarrow \mathcal{F}$ for $\mathcal G$ on Y and $\mathcal F$ on X, respectively. However, these are almost never isomorphisms—see the localization example below.

== Verdier duality ==
Verdier duality gives another link between them: morally speaking, it exchanges "∗" and "!", i.e. in the synopsis above it exchanges functors along the diagonals. For example the direct image is dual to the direct image with compact support. This phenomenon is studied and used in the theory of perverse sheaves.

== Base Change ==
Another useful property of the image functors is base change. Given continuous maps $f:X \rightarrow Z$ and $g:Y \rightarrow Z$, which induce morphisms $\bar f:X\times_Z Y \rightarrow Y$ and $\bar g:X\times_Z Y \rightarrow X$, there exists a canonical isomorphism $R \bar f_* R\bar g^! \cong Rf^! Rg_*$.

== Localization ==
In the particular situation of a closed subspace i: Z ⊂ X and the complementary open subset j: U ⊂ X, the situation simplifies insofar that for j^{∗}=j^{!} and i_{!}=i_{∗} and for any sheaf F on X, one gets exact sequences

0 → j_{!}j^{∗} F → F → i_{∗}i^{∗} F → 0

Its Verdier dual reads

i_{∗}Ri^{!} F → F → Rj_{∗}j^{∗} F → i_{∗}Ri^{!} F[1],

a distinguished triangle in the derived category of sheaves on X.

The adjointness relations read in this case

$$i^* \leftrightarrows i_*=i_! \leftrightarrows i^!$$

and

$$j_! \leftrightarrows j^!=j^* \leftrightarrows j_*$$.

== See also ==
- Six operations
