= James Clark Gentles =

Scottish mycologist (1921–1997)

Professor James Clark Gentles FRSE
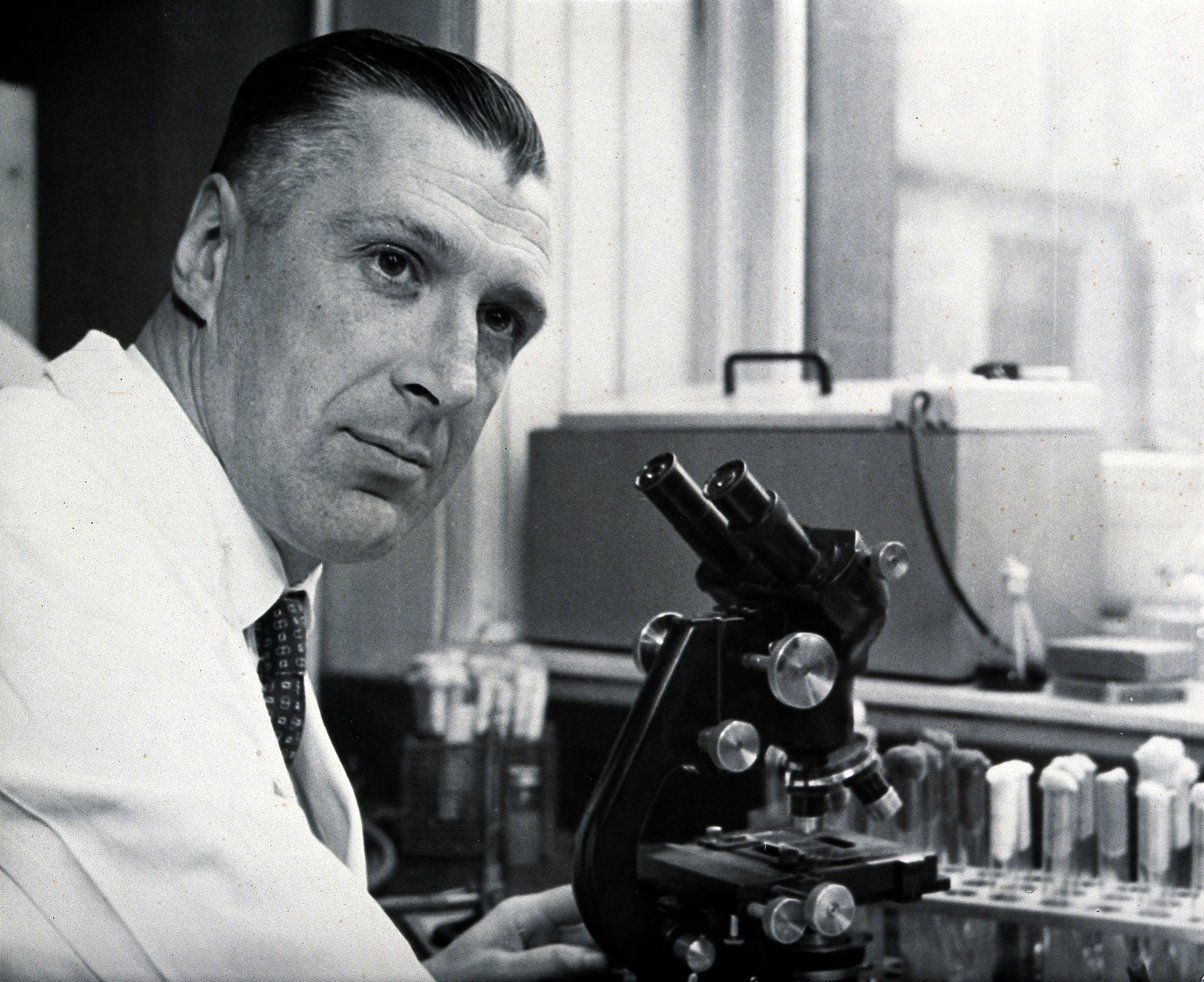
- Gentles in 1968
- Born: 18 March 1921; Coatbridge, Scotland
- Died: 15 November 1997 (aged 76)
- Education: Pasteur Institute; London School of Hygiene and Tropical Medicine; Glasgow University
- Occupations: Mycologist, radar operator

James Clark Gentles FRSE (18 March 1921 – 15 November 1997) was a Scottish mycologist and the first British person to specialise in fungal disease on the human body.

== Life ==
He was born in Coatbridge, on 18 March 1921. He was the son of the manager of a steelworks. He attended school locally then went to Glasgow University studying Natural History. He graduated BSc and continued obtaining a doctorate (PhD).

During World War II, Gentles served in the Royal Air Force as a radar operator. He was commissioned in 1942 and was in command of radar equipment in the then-British colony of Burma.

In 1947, Carl Hamilton Browning hired Gentles to Head his new department investigating fungal diseases of the human body at Glasgow University. He first trained him up further, organising a Distillers Company Scholarship to fund a years specialisation in mycology at Glasgow then a further year in Paris at the Pasteur Institute, followed by a course at the London School of Hygiene and Tropical Medicine. On return to Browning in Glasgow, he was appointed to the Medical Research Council, his first task being to investigate ringworm in the feet of Scottish miners. In 1976, he was given his professorship.

In 1981, he was elected a Fellow of the Royal Society of Edinburgh. His proposers were William Whigham Fletcher, William McPhee Hutchison, William D. P. Stewart, John Hawthorn, Ernest Oliver Morris and John Smith.

Gentles was a keen golfer, serving as Captain of Lenzie Golf Club.

He died on 15 November 1997, aged 76.

== Family ==
He was married to Barr Gentles. They had a son James (born in Paris) and daughter Carine.
