= Torsion sheaf =

In mathematics, a torsion sheaf is a sheaf of abelian groups $\mathcal{F}$ on a site for which, for every object U, the space of sections $\Gamma(U, \mathcal{F})$ is a torsion abelian group. Similarly, for a prime number p, we say a sheaf $\mathcal{F}$ is p-torsion if every section over any object is killed by a power of p.

A torsion sheaf on an étale site is the union of its constructible subsheaves.

== See also ==
- Twisted sheaf
