= Direct image with compact support =

In mathematics, the direct image with compact (or proper) support is an image functor for sheaves that extends the compactly supported global sections functor to the relative setting. It is one of Grothendieck's six operations.

== Definition ==
Let $f:X\to Y$ be a continuous mapping of locally compact Hausdorff topological spaces, and let $\mathrm{Sh}(-)$ denote the category of sheaves of abelian groups on a topological space. The direct image with compact (or proper) support is the functor

$$f_{!}:\mathrm{Sh}(X)\to \mathrm{Sh}(Y)$$

that sends a sheaf $\mathcal{F}$ on $X$ to the sheaf $f_{!}(\mathcal{F})$ given by the formula

$$f_{!}(\mathcal{F})(U):=\{s\in\mathcal{F}(f^{-1}(U)) \mid {f\vert}_{\operatorname{supp}(s)}:\operatorname{supp}(s)\to U \text{ is proper}\}$$

for every open subset $U$ of $Y$. Here, the notion of a proper map of spaces is unambiguous since the spaces in question are locally compact Hausdorff. This defines $f_{!}(\mathcal{F})$ as a subsheaf of the direct image sheaf $f_*(\mathcal{F})$ and the functoriality of this construction then follows from basic properties of the support and the definition of sheaves.

The assumption that the spaces be locally compact Hausdorff is imposed in most sources (e.g., Iversen or Kashiwara–Schapira). In slightly greater generality, Olaf Schnürer and Wolfgang Soergel have introduced the notion of a "locally proper" map of spaces and shown that the functor of direct image with compact support remains well-behaved when defined for separated and locally proper continuous maps between arbitrary spaces.

== Properties ==
- If $f$ is proper, then $f_!$ equals $f_*$.
- If $f$ is an open embedding, then $f_!$ identifies with the extension by zero functor.
