= Topological pair =

Concept in algebraic topology

In mathematics, more specifically algebraic topology, a pair $(X,A)$ is shorthand for an inclusion of topological spaces $i\colon A \hookrightarrow X$. Sometimes $i$ is assumed to be a cofibration. A morphism from $(X,A)$ to $(X',A')$ is given by two maps $f\colon X\rightarrow X'$ and $g\colon A \rightarrow A'$ such that $i' \circ g =f \circ i$.

A pair of spaces is an ordered pair (X, A) where X is a topological space and A a subspace. The use of pairs of spaces is sometimes more convenient and technically superior to taking a quotient space of X by A. Pairs of spaces occur centrally in relative homology, homology theory and cohomology theory, where chains in $A$ are made equivalent to 0, when considered as chains in $X$.

Heuristically, one often thinks of a pair $(X,A)$ as being akin to the quotient space $X/A$.

There is a functor from the category of topological spaces to the category of pairs of spaces, which sends a space $X$ to the pair $(X, \varnothing)$.

A related concept is that of a triple (X, A, B), with B ⊂ A ⊂ X. Triples are used in homotopy theory. Often, for a pointed space with basepoint at x_{0}, one writes the triple as (X, A, B, x_{0}), where x_{0} ∈ B ⊂ A ⊂ X.
