= Verdier duality =

Duality for sheaves of k-modules over a locally compact space

In mathematics, Verdier duality is a cohomological duality in algebraic topology that generalizes Poincaré duality for manifolds. Verdier duality was introduced in 1965 by Jean-Louis Verdier (1965) as an analog for locally compact topological spaces of Alexander Grothendieck's theory of Poincaré duality in étale cohomology for schemes in algebraic geometry. It is thus (together with the said étale theory and for example Grothendieck's coherent duality) one instance of Grothendieck's six operations formalism.

Verdier duality generalises the classical Poincaré duality of manifolds in two directions: it applies to continuous maps from one space to another (reducing to the classical case for the unique map from a manifold to a one-point space), and it applies to spaces that fail to be manifolds due to the presence of singularities. It is commonly encountered when studying constructible or perverse sheaves.

== Verdier duality ==
Verdier duality states that (subject to suitable finiteness conditions discussed below) certain derived image functors for sheaves are actually adjoint functors. There are two versions.

Global Verdier duality states that for a continuous map $f\colon X \to Y$ of locally compact Hausdorff spaces, the derived functor of the direct image with compact (or proper) supports $Rf_!$ has a right adjoint $f^!$ in the derived category of sheaves, in other words, for (complexes of) sheaves (of abelian groups) $\mathcal F$ on $X$ and $\mathcal G$ on $Y$ we have

$$RHom(Rf_!\mathcal{F},\mathcal{G}) \cong RHom(\mathcal{F},f^!\mathcal{G}).$$

Local Verdier duality states that

$$R\,\mathcal{H}om(Rf_!\mathcal{F},\mathcal{G}) \cong Rf_{\ast}R\,\mathcal{H}om(\mathcal{F},f^!\mathcal{G})$$

in the derived category of sheaves on Y. The distinction between the global and local versions is that the former relates morphisms between complexes of sheaves in the derived categories, whereas the latter relates internal Hom-complexes and so can be evaluated locally. Taking global sections of both sides in the local statement gives the global Verdier duality.

These results hold subject to the compactly supported direct image functor $f_{!}$ having finite cohomological dimension. This is the case if there is a bound $d\in\mathbf{N}$ such that the compactly supported cohomology $H_c^{r}(X_y,\mathbf{Z})$ vanishes for all fibres $X_y = f^{-1}(y)$ (where $y\in Y$) and $r>d$. This holds if all the fibres $X_y$ are at most $d$-dimensional manifolds or more generally at most $d$-dimensional CW-complexes.

The discussion above is about derived categories of sheaves of abelian groups. It is also possible to consider a ring $A$ and (derived categories of) sheaves of $A$-modules; the case above corresponds to $A=\mathbf{Z}$.

The dualizing complex $D_X$ on $X$ is defined to be

$$\omega_X = p^!(k) ,$$

where p is the map from $X$ to a point. Part of what makes Verdier duality interesting in the singular setting is that when $X$ is not a manifold (a graph or singular algebraic variety for example) then the dualizing complex is not, in general, quasi-isomorphic to a sheaf concentrated in a single degree (see Cohen–Macaulay ring for an example of a singular variety/scheme whose dualizing complex is a sheaf). From this perspective the derived category is necessary in the study of singular spaces.

If $X$ is a finite-dimensional locally compact space, and $D^b(X)$ the bounded derived category of sheaves of abelian groups over $X$, then the Verdier dual is a contravariant functor

$$D \colon D^b(X)\to D^b(X)$$

defined by

$$D(\mathcal{F}) = R\,\mathcal{H}om(\mathcal{F}, \omega_X) .$$

It has the following properties:

- $D^2(\mathcal{F})\cong \mathcal{F}$ for sheaves with constructible cohomology.
- (Intertwining of functors $f_*$ and $f_!$). If $f$ is a continuous map from $X$ to $Y$, then there is an isomorphism
  $$D(Rf_{!}(\mathcal{F})) \cong Rf_\ast D(\mathcal{F})$$.

== Relation to classical Poincaré duality ==
Poincaré duality can be derived as a special case of Verdier duality. Here one explicitly calculates cohomology of a space using the machinery of sheaf cohomology.

Suppose X is a compact orientable n-dimensional manifold, k is a field and $k_X$ is the constant sheaf on X with coefficients in k. Let $f=p$ be the constant map to a point. Global Verdier duality then states

$$[Rp_!k_X,k] \cong [k_X,p^!k] .$$

To understand how Poincaré duality is obtained from this statement, it is perhaps easiest to understand both sides piece by piece. Let

$$k_X\to (I^{\bullet}_X = I^0_X \to I^1_X \to \cdots)$$

be an injective resolution of the constant sheaf. Then by standard facts on right derived functors

$$Rp_!k_X=p_!I^{\bullet}_X=\Gamma_c(X;I^{\bullet}_X)$$

is a complex whose cohomology is the compactly supported cohomology of X. Since morphisms between complexes of sheaves (or vector spaces) themselves form a complex we find that

$$\mathrm{Hom}^{\bullet}(\Gamma_c(X;I^{\bullet}_X),k)= \cdots \to \Gamma_c(X;I^2_X)^{\vee}\to \Gamma_c(X;I^1_X)^{\vee}\to \Gamma_c(X;I^0_X)^{\vee}\to 0$$

where the last non-zero term is in degree 0 and the ones to the left are in negative degree. Morphisms in the derived category are obtained from the homotopy category of chain complexes of sheaves by taking the zeroth cohomology of the complex, i.e.

$$[Rp_!k_X,k]\cong H^0(\mathrm{Hom}^{\bullet}(\Gamma_c(X;I^{\bullet}_X),k))=H^0_c(X;k_X)^{\vee}.$$

For the other side of the Verdier duality statement above, we have to take for granted the fact that when X is a compact orientable n-dimensional manifold

$$p^!k=k_X[n],$$

which is the dualizing complex for a manifold. Now we can re-express the right hand side as

$$[k_X,k_X[n]]\cong H^n(\mathrm{Hom}^{\bullet}(k_X,k_X))=H^n(X;k_X).$$

We finally have obtained the statement that

$$H^0_c(X;k_X)^{\vee}\cong H^n(X;k_X).$$

By repeating this argument with the sheaf k_{X} replaced with the same sheaf placed in degree i we get the classical Poincaré duality

$$H^i_c(X;k_X)^{\vee}\cong H^{n-i}(X;k_X).$$

== See also ==
- Poincaré duality
- Six operations
- Coherent duality
- Derived category
