= Local Tate duality =

Duality for Galois modules for the absolute Galois group of a non-archimedean local field

In Galois cohomology, local Tate duality (or simply local duality) is a duality for Galois modules for the absolute Galois group of a non-archimedean local field. It is named after John Tate who first proved it. It shows that the dual of such a Galois module is the Tate twist of usual linear dual. This new dual is called the (local) Tate dual.

Local duality combined with Tate's local Euler characteristic formula provide a versatile set of tools for computing the Galois cohomology of local fields.

== Statement ==
Let K be a non-archimedean local field, let K^{s} denote a separable closure of K, and let G_{K} = Gal(K^{s}/K) be the absolute Galois group of K.

=== Case of finite modules ===
Denote by μ the Galois module of all roots of unity in K^{s}. Given a finite G_{K}-module A of order prime to the characteristic of K, the Tate dual of A is defined as

$$A^\prime=\mathrm{Hom}(A,\mu)$$

(i.e. it is the Tate twist of the usual dual A^{∗}). Let H^{i}(K, A) denote the group cohomology of G_{K} with coefficients in A. The theorem states that the pairing

$$H^i(K,A)\times H^{2-i}(K,A^\prime)\rightarrow H^2(K,\mu)=\mathbf{Q}/\mathbf{Z}$$

given by the cup product sets up a duality between H^{i}(K, A) and H^{2−i}(K, A^{′}) for i = 0, 1, 2. Since G_{K} has cohomological dimension equal to two, the higher cohomology groups vanish.

=== Case of p-adic representations ===
Let p be a prime number. Let Q_{p}(1) denote the p-adic cyclotomic character of G_{K} (i.e. the Tate module of μ). A p-adic representation of G_{K} is a continuous representation

$$\rho:G_K\rightarrow\mathrm{GL}(V)$$

where V is a finite-dimensional vector space over the p-adic numbers Q_{p} and GL(V) denotes the group of invertible linear maps from V to itself. The Tate dual of V is defined as

$$V^\prime=\mathrm{Hom}(V,\mathbf{Q}_p(1))$$

(i.e. it is the Tate twist of the usual dual V^{∗} = Hom(V, Q_{p})). In this case, H^{i}(K, V) denotes the continuous group cohomology of G_{K} with coefficients in V. Local Tate duality applied to V says that the cup product induces a pairing

$$H^i(K,V)\times H^{2-i}(K,V^\prime)\rightarrow H^2(K,\mathbf{Q}_p(1))=\mathbf{Q}_p$$

which is a duality between H^{i}(K, V) and H^{2−i}(K, V ′) for i = 0, 1, 2. Again, the higher cohomology groups vanish.

== See also ==
- Tate duality, a global version (i.e. for global fields)
