= P-adic Hodge theory =

Mathematical theory

In mathematics, p-adic Hodge theory is a theory that provides a way to classify and study p-adic Galois representations of characteristic 0 local fields with residual characteristic p (such as Q_{p}). The theory has its beginnings in Jean-Pierre Serre and John Tate's study of Tate modules of abelian varieties and the notion of Hodge–Tate representation. Hodge–Tate representations are related to certain decompositions of p-adic cohomology theories analogous to the Hodge decomposition, hence the name p-adic Hodge theory. Further developments were inspired by properties of p-adic Galois representations arising from the étale cohomology of varieties. Jean-Marc Fontaine introduced many of the basic concepts of the field.

== General classification of p-adic representations ==
Let $K$ be a local field with residue field $k$ of characteristic $p$. In this article, a $p$-adic representation of $K$ (or of $G_K$, the absolute Galois group of $K$) will be a continuous representation $\rho:G_K\to\text{GL}(V)$, where $V$ is a finite-dimensional vector space over $\Q_p$. The collection of all $p$-adic representations of $K$ form an abelian category denoted $\mathrm{Rep}_{\Q_p}(K)$ in this article. $p$-adic Hodge theory provides subcollections of $p$-adic representations based on how nice they are, and also provides faithful functors to categories of linear algebraic objects that are easier to study. The basic classification is as follows:

$$\operatorname{Rep}_\mathrm{crys}(K)\subsetneq\operatorname{Rep}_{ss}(K) \subsetneq \operatorname{Rep}_{dR}(K)\subsetneq \operatorname{Rep}_{HT}(K) \subsetneq \operatorname{Rep}_{\Q_p}(K)$$

where each collection is a full subcategory properly contained in the next. In order, these are the categories of crystalline representations, semistable representations, de Rham representations, Hodge–Tate representations, and all p-adic representations. In addition, two other categories of representations can be introduced, the potentially crystalline representations $\operatorname{Rep}_\mathrm{pcrys}(K)$ and the potentially semistable representations $\operatorname{Rep}_\mathrm{pss}(K)$. The latter strictly contains the former which in turn generally strictly contains $\operatorname{Rep}_\mathrm{crys}(K)$; additionally, $\operatorname{Rep}_\mathrm{pss}(K)$ generally strictly contains $\operatorname{Rep}_\mathrm{ss}(K)$, and is contained in $\operatorname{Rep}_{dR}(K)$ (with equality when the residue field of $K$ is finite, a statement called the p-adic monodromy theorem).

== Period rings and comparison isomorphisms in arithmetic geometry ==
The general strategy of p-adic Hodge theory, introduced by Fontaine, is to construct certain so-called period rings such as B_{dR}, B_{st}, B_{cris}, and B_{HT} which have both an action by G_{K} and some linear algebraic structure and to consider so-called Dieudonné modules

$$D_B(V)=(B\otimes_{\mathbf{Q}_p}V)^{G_K}$$

(where B is a period ring, and V is a p-adic representation) which no longer have a G_{K}-action, but are endowed with linear algebraic structures inherited from the ring B. In particular, they are vector spaces over the fixed field $E:=B^{G_K}$. This construction fits into the formalism of B-admissible representations introduced by Fontaine. For a period ring like the aforementioned ones B_{∗} (for ∗ = HT, dR, st, cris), the category of p-adic representations Rep_{∗}(K) mentioned above is the category of B_{∗}-admissible ones, i.e. those p-adic representations V for which

$$\dim_ED_{B_\ast}(V)=\dim_{\mathbf{Q}_p}V$$

or, equivalently, the comparison morphism

$$\alpha_V:B_\ast\otimes_ED_{B_\ast}(V)\longrightarrow B_\ast \otimes_{\mathbf{Q}_p}V$$

is an isomorphism.

This formalism (and the name period ring) grew out of a few results and conjectures regarding comparison isomorphisms in arithmetic and complex geometry:

- If X is a proper smooth scheme over C, there is a classical comparison isomorphism between the algebraic de Rham cohomology of X over C and the singular cohomology of X(C)

$$H^\ast_{\mathrm{dR}}(X/\mathbf{C})\cong H^\ast(X(\mathbf{C}),\mathbf{Q})\otimes_\mathbf{Q}\mathbf{C}.$$

This isomorphism can be obtained by considering a pairing obtained by integrating differential forms in the algebraic de Rham cohomology over cycles in the singular cohomology. The result of such an integration is called a period and is generally a complex number. This explains why the singular cohomology must be tensored to C, and from this point of view, C can be said to contain all the periods necessary to compare algebraic de Rham cohomology with singular cohomology, and could hence be called a period ring in this situation.

- In the mid sixties, Tate conjectured that a similar isomorphism should hold for proper smooth schemes X over K between algebraic de Rham cohomology and p-adic étale cohomology (the Hodge–Tate conjecture, also called C_{HT}). Specifically, let C_{K} be the completion of an algebraic closure of K, let C_{K}(i) denote C_{K} where the action of G_{K} is via g·z = χ(g)^{i}g·z (where χ is the p-adic cyclotomic character, and i is an integer), and let $B_{\mathrm{HT}}:=\oplus_{i\in\mathbf{Z}}\mathbf{C}_K(i)$. Then there is a functorial isomorphism

$$B_{\mathrm{HT}}\otimes_K\mathrm{gr}H^\ast_{\mathrm{dR}}(X/K)\cong B_{\mathrm{HT}}\otimes_{\mathbf{Q}_p}H^\ast_{\mathrm{\acute{e}t}}(X\times_K\overline{K},\mathbf{Q}_p)$$

of graded vector spaces with G_{K}-action (the de Rham cohomology is equipped with the Hodge filtration, and $\mathrm{gr}H^\ast_{\mathrm{dR}}$ is its associated graded). This conjecture was proved by Gerd Faltings in the late eighties after partial results by several other mathematicians (including Tate himself).

- For an abelian variety X with good reduction over a p-adic field K, Alexander Grothendieck reformulated a theorem of Tate's to say that the crystalline cohomology H^{1}(X/W(k)) ⊗ Q_{p} of the special fiber (with the Frobenius endomorphism on this group and the Hodge filtration on this group tensored with K) and the p-adic étale cohomology H^{1}(X,Q_{p}) (with the action of the Galois group of K) contained the same information. Both are equivalent to the p-divisible group associated to X, up to isogeny. Grothendieck conjectured that there should be a way to go directly from p-adic étale cohomology to crystalline cohomology (and back), for all varieties with good reduction over p-adic fields. This suggested relation became known as the mysterious functor.

To improve the Hodge–Tate conjecture to one involving the de Rham cohomology (not just its associated graded), Fontaine constructed a filtered ring B_{dR} whose associated graded is B_{HT} and conjectured the following (called C_{dR}) for any smooth proper scheme X over K

$$B_{\mathrm{dR}}\otimes_KH^\ast_{\mathrm{dR}}(X/K)\cong B_{\mathrm{dR}}\otimes_{\mathbf{Q}_p}H^\ast_{\mathrm{\acute{e}t}}(X\times_K\overline{K},\mathbf{Q}_p)$$

as filtered vector spaces with G_{K}-action. In this way, B_{dR} could be said to contain all (p-adic) periods required to compare algebraic de Rham cohomology with p-adic étale cohomology, just as the complex numbers above were used with the comparison with singular cohomology. This is where B_{dR} obtains its name of ring of p-adic periods.

Similarly, to formulate a conjecture explaining Grothendieck's mysterious functor, Fontaine introduced a ring B_{cris} with G_{K}-action, a "Frobenius" φ, and a filtration after extending scalars from K_{0} to K. He conjectured the following (called C_{cris}) for any smooth proper scheme X over K with good reduction

$$B_{\mathrm{cris}}\otimes_{K_0}H^\ast_{\mathrm{dR}}(X/K)\cong B_{\mathrm{cris}}\otimes_{\mathbf{Q}_p}H^\ast_{\mathrm{\acute{e}t}}(X\times_K\overline{K},\mathbf{Q}_p)$$

as vector spaces with φ-action, G_{K}-action, and filtration after extending scalars to K (here $H^\ast_{\mathrm{dR}}(X/K)$ is given its structure as a K_{0}-vector space with φ-action given by its comparison with crystalline cohomology). Both the C_{dR} and the C_{cris} conjectures were proved by Faltings.

Upon comparing these two conjectures with the notion of B_{∗}-admissible representations above, it is seen that if X is a proper smooth scheme over K (with good reduction) and V is the p-adic Galois representation obtained as is its ith p-adic étale cohomology group, then

$$D_{B_\ast}(V)=H^i_{\mathrm{dR}}(X/K).$$

In other words, the Dieudonné modules should be thought of as giving the other cohomologies related to V.

In the late eighties, Fontaine and Uwe Jannsen formulated another comparison isomorphism conjecture, C_{st}, this time allowing X to have semi-stable reduction. Fontaine constructed a ring B_{st} with G_{K}-action, a "Frobenius" φ, a filtration after extending scalars from K_{0} to K (and fixing an extension of the p-adic logarithm), and a "monodromy operator" N. When X has semi-stable reduction, the de Rham cohomology can be equipped with the φ-action and a monodromy operator by its comparison with the log-crystalline cohomology first introduced by Osamu Hyodo. The conjecture then states that

$$B_{\mathrm{st}}\otimes_{K_0}H^\ast_{\mathrm{log-cris}}(X/K)\cong B_{\mathrm{st}}\otimes_{\mathbf{Q}_p}H^\ast_{\mathrm{\acute{e}t}}(X\times_K\overline{K},\mathbf{Q}_p)$$

as vector spaces with φ-action, G_{K}-action, filtration after extending scalars to K, and monodromy operator N. This conjecture was proved in the late nineties by Takeshi Tsuji.

== See also ==
- Hodge theory
- Arakelov theory
- Hodge-Arakelov theory
- p-adic Teichmüller theory
