= Local Euler characteristic formula =

In the mathematical field of Galois cohomology, the local Euler characteristic formula is a result due to John Tate that computes the Euler characteristic of the group cohomology of the absolute Galois group G_{K} of a non-archimedean local field K.

== Statement ==
Let K be a non-archimedean local field, let K^{s} denote a separable closure of K, let G_{K} = Gal(K^{s}/K) be the absolute Galois group of K, and let H^{i}(K, M) denote the group cohomology of G_{K} with coefficients in M. Since the cohomological dimension of G_{K} is two, H^{i}(K, M) = 0 for i ≥ 3. Therefore, the Euler characteristic only involves the groups with i = 0, 1, 2.

=== Case of finite modules ===
Let M be a G_{K}-module of finite order m. The Euler characteristic of M is defined to be

$$\chi(G_K,M)=\frac{\# H^0(K,M)\cdot\# H^2(K,M)}{\# H^1(K,M)}$$

(the ith cohomology groups for i ≥ 3 appear tacitly as their sizes are all one).

Let R denote the ring of integers of K. Tate's result then states that if m is relatively prime to the characteristic of K, then

$$\chi(G_K,M)=\left(\#R/mR\right)^{-1},$$

i.e. the inverse of the order of the quotient ring R/mR.

Two special cases worth singling out are the following. If the order of M is relatively prime to the characteristic of the residue field of K, then the Euler characteristic is one. If K is a finite extension of the p-adic numbers Q_{p}, and if v_{p} denotes the p-adic valuation, then

$$\chi(G_K,M)=p^{-[K:\mathbf{Q}_p]v_p(m)}$$

where [K:Q_{p}] is the degree of K over Q_{p}.

The Euler characteristic can be rewritten, using local Tate duality, as

$$\chi(G_K,M)=\frac{\# H^0(K,M)\cdot\# H^0(K,M^\prime)}{\# H^1(K,M)}$$

where M^{′} is the local Tate dual of M.
