= Local class field theory =

In mathematics, local class field theory (LCFT), introduced by Helmut Hasse, is the study of abelian extensions of local fields; here, "local field" means a field which is complete with respect to an absolute value or a discrete valuation with a finite residue field: hence every local field is isomorphic (as a topological field) to the real numbers R, the complex numbers C, a finite extension of the p-adic numbers Q_{p} (where p is any prime number), or the field of formal Laurent series F_{q}((T)) over a finite field F_{q}.

== Approaches to local class field theory ==
Local class field theory gives a description of the Galois group G of the maximal abelian extension of a local field K via the reciprocity map which acts from the multiplicative group K^{×}=K\{0}. For a finite abelian extension L of K the reciprocity map induces an isomorphism of the quotient group K^{×}/N(L^{×}) of K^{×} by the norm group N(L^{×}) of the extension L^{×} to the Galois group Gal(L/K) of the extension.

The existence theorem in local class field theory establishes a one-to-one correspondence between open subgroups of finite index in the multiplicative group K^{×} and finite abelian extensions of the field K. For a finite abelian extension L of K the corresponding open subgroup of finite index is the norm group N(L^{×}). The reciprocity map sends higher groups of units to higher ramification subgroups.^{Ch. 4}

Using the local reciprocity map, one defines the Hilbert symbol and its generalizations. Finding explicit formulas for it is one of subdirections of the theory of local fields, it has a long and rich history, see e.g. Sergei Vostokov's review.

There are cohomological approaches and non-cohomological approaches to local class field theory. Cohomological approaches tend to be non-explicit, since they use the cup product of the first Galois cohomology groups.

For various approaches to local class field theory see Ch. IV and sect. 7 Ch. IV of. They include the Hasse approach of using the Brauer group, cohomological approaches, the explicit methods of Jürgen Neukirch, Michiel Hazewinkel, the Lubin-Tate theory and others.

== Generalizations of local class field theory ==
Generalizations of local class field theory to local fields with quasi-finite residue field were easy extensions of the theory, obtained by G. Whaples in the 1950s.^{ch. V}

Explicit p-class field theory for local fields with perfect and imperfect residue fields which are not finite has to deal with the new issue of norm groups of infinite index. Appropriate theories were constructed by Ivan Fesenko. Fesenko's noncommutative local class field theory for arithmetically profinite Galois extensions of local fields studies appropriate local reciprocity cocycle map and its properties. This arithmetic theory can be viewed as an alternative to the representation-theoretical local Langlands correspondence.

== Higher local class field theory ==
For a higher-dimensional local field $K$ there is a higher local reciprocity map which describes abelian extensions of the field in terms of open subgroups of finite index in the Milnor K-group of the field. Namely, if $K$ is an $n$-dimensional local field then one uses $\mathrm{K}^{\mathrm{M}}_n(K)$ or its separated quotient endowed with a suitable topology. When $n=1$ the theory becomes the usual local class field theory. Unlike the classical case, Milnor K-groups do not satisfy Galois module descent if $n>1$. General higher-dimensional local class field theory was developed by K. Kato and I. Fesenko.

Higher local class field theory is part of higher class field theory which studies abelian extensions (resp. abelian covers) of rational function fields of proper regular schemes flat over integers.
