= Tate group =

In mathematics, a Tate group, named for John Tate, may refer to:

- Barsotti–Tate group
- Mumford–Tate group
- Tate cohomology group
- Tate–Shafarevich group
