= Compatible system of ℓ-adic representations =

In number theory, a compatible system of ℓ-adic representations is an abstraction of certain important families of ℓ-adic Galois representations, indexed by prime numbers ℓ, that have compatibility properties for almost all ℓ.

== Examples ==
Prototypical examples include the cyclotomic character and the Tate module of an abelian variety.

== Variations ==
A slightly more restrictive notion is that of a strictly compatible system of ℓ-adic representations which offers more control on the compatibility properties. More recently, some authors have started requiring more compatibility related to p-adic Hodge theory.

== Importance ==
Compatible systems of ℓ-adic representations are a fundamental concept in contemporary algebraic number theory.
