= Tate conjecture =

Conjecture in algebraic geometry

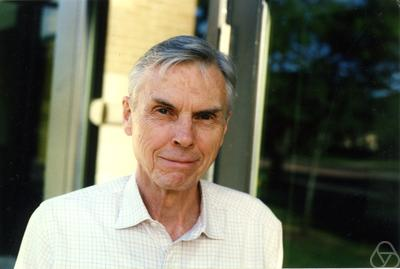
- John Tate in 1993
- Field: Algebraic geometry and number theory
- Conjectured by: John Tate
- Conjectured in: 1963
- Known cases: divisors on abelian varieties
- Consequences: Standard conjectures on algebraic cycles

In mathematics, specifically arithmetic geometry, the Tate conjecture is a 1963 conjecture of John Tate that would describe the algebraic cycles on a variety in terms of a more computable invariant, the Galois representation on étale cohomology. The conjecture is a central problem in the theory of algebraic cycles. It can be considered an arithmetic analog of the Hodge conjecture.

== Statement of the conjecture ==
Let $V$ be a smooth projective variety over a field $k$ which is finitely generated over its prime field. Let $k_s$ be a separable closure of $k$, and let $G$ be the absolute Galois group $\operatorname{Gal}(k_s/k)$ of $k$. Fix a prime number $\ell$ which is invertible in $k$. Consider the ℓ-adic cohomology groups (coefficients in the ℓ-adic integers $\Z_\ell$, scalars then extended to the ℓ-adic numbers $\Q_\ell$) of the base extension of $V$ to $k_s$; these groups are representations of $G$. For any $i\geq 0$, a codimension-$i$ subvariety of $V$ (understood to be defined over $k$) determines an element of the cohomology group

$$H^{2i}(V_{k_s},\Q_{\ell}(i)) = W$$

which is fixed by $G$. Here $\Q_\ell(i)$ denotes the $i$th Tate twist, which means that this representation of the Galois group $G$ is tensored with the $i$th power of the cyclotomic character.

The Tate conjecture states that the subspace $W^G$ of $W$ fixed by the Galois group $G$ is spanned, as a $\Q_\ell$-vector space, by the classes of codimension-$i$ subvarieties of $V$. An algebraic cycle means a finite linear combination of subvarieties; so an equivalent statement is that every element of $W^G$ is the class of an algebraic cycle on $V$ with $\Q_\ell$ coefficients.

== Known cases ==
The Tate conjecture for divisors (algebraic cycles of codimension 1) is a major open problem. For example, let $f:X\to C$ be a morphism from a smooth projective surface onto a smooth projective curve over a finite field. Suppose that the generic fiber $F$ of $f$, which is a curve over the function field $k(C)$, is smooth over $k(C)$. Then the Tate conjecture for divisors on $X$ is equivalent to the Birch and Swinnerton-Dyer conjecture for the Jacobian variety of $F$. By contrast, the Hodge conjecture for divisors on any smooth complex projective variety is known; this is the Lefschetz (1,1)-theorem.

Probably the most important known case is that the Tate conjecture is true for divisors on abelian varieties. This is a theorem of Tate for abelian varieties over finite fields, and of Faltings for abelian varieties over number fields, part of Faltings' solution of the Mordell conjecture. Zarhin extended these results to any finitely generated base field. The Tate conjecture for divisors on abelian varieties implies the Tate conjecture for divisors on any product of curves $C_1\times\cdots\times C_n$.

The (known) Tate conjecture for divisors on abelian varieties is equivalent to a powerful statement about homomorphisms between abelian varieties. Namely, for any abelian varieties $A$ and $B$ over a finitely generated field $k$, the natural map

$$\text{Hom}(A,B)\otimes_{\Z}\Q_{\ell} \to \text{Hom}_G \left (H_1 \left (A_{k_s},\Q_{\ell} \right), H_1 \left (B_{k_s},\Q_{\ell} \right) \right )$$

is an isomorphism. In particular, an abelian variety $A$ is determined up to isogeny by the Galois representation on its Tate module $H_1(A_{k_s},\Z_\ell)$.

The Tate conjecture also holds for K3 surfaces over finitely generated fields of characteristic not 2. (On a surface, the nontrivial part of the conjecture is about divisors.) In characteristic zero, the Tate conjecture for K3 surfaces was proved by André and Tankeev. For K3 surfaces over finite fields of characteristic not 2, the Tate conjecture was proved by Nygaard, Ogus, Charles, Madapusi Pera, and Maulik.

In October 2026, OpenAI released a catalogue of manuscripts produced by an internal model, one of which claims the Tate conjecture for abelian varieties over finite fields, in all dimensions, codimensions and characteristics.

Totaro surveys known cases of the Tate conjecture.

== Related conjectures ==
Let $X$ be a smooth projective variety over a finitely generated field $k$. The semisimplicity conjecture predicts that the representation of the Galois group $G=\operatorname{Gal}(k_s/k)$ on the $\ell$-adic cohomology of $X$ is semisimple (that is, a direct sum of irreducible representations). For $k$ of characteristic 0, Moonen showed that the Tate conjecture (as stated above) implies the semisimplicity of

$$H^I \big(X \times_k \overline{k}, \Q_\ell(n)\big).$$

For $k$ finite of order $q$, Tate showed that the Tate conjecture plus the semisimplicity conjecture would imply the strong Tate conjecture, namely that the order of the pole of the zeta function $Z(X,t)$ at $t=q^{-j}$ is equal to the rank of the group of algebraic cycles of codimension $j$ modulo numerical equivalence.

Like the Hodge conjecture, the Tate conjecture would imply most of Grothendieck's standard conjectures on algebraic cycles. Namely, it would imply the Lefschetz standard conjecture (that the inverse of the Lefschetz isomorphism is defined by an algebraic correspondence); that the Künneth components of the diagonal are algebraic; and that numerical equivalence and homological equivalence of algebraic cycles are the same.
