= Mumford–Tate group =

Mathematics concept

In algebraic geometry, the Mumford–Tate group (or Hodge group) MT(F) constructed from a Hodge structure F is a certain algebraic group G. When F is given by a rational representation of an algebraic torus, the definition of G is as the Zariski closure of the image in the representation of the circle group, over the rational numbers. Mumford (1966) introduced Mumford–Tate groups over the complex numbers under the name of Hodge groups. Serre (1967) introduced the p-adic analogue of Mumford's construction for Hodge–Tate modules, using the work of Tate (1967) on p-divisible groups, and named them Mumford–Tate groups.

== Formulation ==
The algebraic torus T used to describe Hodge structures has a concrete matrix representation, as the 2×2 invertible matrices of the shape that is given by the action of a+bi on the basis {1,i} of the complex numbers C over R:

$$\begin{bmatrix} a & b \\ -b & a \end{bmatrix}.$$

The circle group inside this group of matrices is the unitary group U(1).

Hodge structures arising in geometry, for example on the cohomology groups of Kähler manifolds, have a lattice consisting of the integral cohomology classes. Not quite so much is needed for the definition of the Mumford–Tate group, but it does assume that the vector space V underlying the Hodge structure has a given rational structure, i.e. is given over the rational numbers Q. For the purposes of the theory the complex vector space V_{C}, obtained by extending the scalars of V from Q to C, is used.

The weight k of the Hodge structure describes the action of the diagonal matrices of T, and V is supposed therefore to be homogeneous of weight k, under that action. Under the action of the full group V_{C} breaks up into subspaces V^{pq}, complex conjugate in pairs under switching p and q. Thinking of the matrix in terms of the complex number λ it represents, V^{pq} has the action of λ by the pth power and of the complex conjugate of λ by the qth power. Here necessarily

p + q = k.

In more abstract terms, the torus T underlying the matrix group is the Weil restriction of the multiplicative group GL(1), from the complex field to the real field, an algebraic torus whose character group consists of the two homomorphisms to GL(1), interchanged by complex conjugation.

Once formulated in this fashion, the rational representation ρ of T on V setting up the Hodge structure F determines the image ρ(U(1)) in GL(V_{C}); and MT(F) is by definition the smallest algebraic group defined over Q containing this image.

== Mumford–Tate conjecture ==
The original context for the formulation of the group in question was the question of the Galois representation on the Tate module of an abelian variety A. Conjecturally, the image of such a Galois representation, which is an l-adic Lie group for a given prime number l, is determined by the corresponding Mumford–Tate group G (coming from the Hodge structure on H^{1}(A)), to the extent that knowledge of G determines the Lie algebra of the Galois image. This conjecture is known only in particular cases. Through generalisations of this conjecture, the Mumford–Tate group has been connected to the motivic Galois group, and, for example, the general issue of extending the Sato–Tate conjecture (now a theorem).

== Period conjecture ==
A related conjecture on abelian varieties states that the period matrix of A over number field has transcendence degree, in the sense of the field generated by its entries, predicted by the dimension of its Mumford–Tate group, as in the previous section. Work of Pierre Deligne has shown that the dimension bounds the transcendence degree; so that the Mumford–Tate group catches sufficiently many algebraic relations between the periods. This is a special case of the full Grothendieck period conjecture.
