= Serre–Tate theorem =

In algebraic geometry, the Serre–Tate theorem says that an abelian scheme and its p-divisible group have the same infinitesimal deformation theory. This was first proved by Jean-Pierre Serre when the reduction of the abelian variety is ordinary, using the Greenberg functor; then John Tate gave a proof in the general case by a different method. Their proofs were not published, but they were summarized in the notes of the Lubin–Serre–Tate seminar (Woods Hole, 1964). Other proofs were published by Messing (1962) and Drinfeld (1976).
