= Iacopo Barsotti =

Italian mathematician (1921–1987)

Iacopo Barsotti, or Jacopo Barsotti (Turin, 28 April 1921 – Padua, 27 October 1987) was an Italian mathematician who introduced Barsotti–Tate groups.

In 1942 he graduated from the Scuola Normale Superiore in Pisa, and became assistant professor Francesco Severi at the University of Rome in 1946. In 1948 he emigrated to the US, first as a guest professor at Princeton University, then as a full professor at the University of Pittsburgh and at Brown University. In 1961 he was recalled to Pisa as a teacher first of Geometry, then of Algebra. From 1968 to his death he taught Geometry at the University of Padua. Iacopo was a visiting scholar at the Institute for Advanced Study in 1982.

His research work mainly concerned algebra and algebraic geometry. In particular, in the field of group theory, he dealt with abelian varieties, theorizing what are now called Barsotti–Tate groups and which are at the basis of crystalline cohomology. He also dealt with theta functions, generalizing them with the introduction of the "theta-like class of functions."

In p-adic Hodge theory, so-called period rings are denoted by the letter B, a nod to Barsotti's work.
