= Fesenko =

Fesenko (Ukrainian: Фесенко) is a Ukrainian surname. Notable people with this name include:

- Ivan Fesenko (born 1962), Russian mathematician
- Kyrylo Fesenko (born 1986), Ukrainian basketball player
- Sergey Fesenko, Sr. (born 1959), Soviet swimmer
- Serhiy Fesenko (born 1982), Ukrainian swimmer
- Yekaterina Fesenko (born 1958), Soviet hurdler
