= Local Fields =

Book by Jean-Pierre Serre

- Author: Jean-Pierre Serre
- Original title: Corps Locaux
- Language: French (original); English (translation)
- Subject: Algebraic number theory
- Genre: Non-fiction
- Publisher: Springer
- Publication date: 1980
- Publication place: France
- Media type: Print
- Pages: 241 pp.
- ISBN: 978-0-387-90424-5
- OCLC: 4933106

Corps Locaux by Jean-Pierre Serre, originally published in 1962 and translated into English as Local Fields by Marvin Jay Greenberg in 1979, is a seminal graduate-level algebraic number theory text covering local fields, ramification, group cohomology, and local class field theory. The book's end goal is to present local class field theory from the cohomological point of view.

In this book, a "local field" is defined as a field complete with respect to a discrete valuation, but current usage (including later works by Serre) add the condition that the residue class field is finite.

The Basic Library List Committee recommends this book for acquisition by undergraduate mathematics libraries. It has over 3500 citations in Google Scholar, and is often referenced with respect.

== Contents ==
1. Part I, Local Fields (Basic Facts): Discrete valuation rings, Dedekind domains, and Completion.
2. Part II, Ramification: Discriminant & Different, Ramification Groups, The Norm, and Artin Representation.
3. Part III, Group Cohomology: Abelian & Nonabelian Cohomology, Cohomology of Finite Groups, Theorems of Tate and Nakayama, Galois Cohomology, Class Formations, and Computation of Cup Products.
4. Part IV, Local Class Field Theory: Brauer Group of a Local Field, Local Class Field Theory, Local Symbols and Existence Theorem, and Ramification.
