= Fontaine–Mazur conjecture =

In mathematics, the Fontaine–Mazur conjectures are some conjectures introduced by Fontaine and Mazur (1995) about when p-adic representations of Galois groups of number fields can be constructed from representations on étale cohomology groups of varieties. Some cases of this conjecture in dimension 2 have been proved by Dieulefait (2004).

The first conjecture stated by Fontaine and Mazur assumes that $\rho \colon \mathrm{Gal}(\overline{\mathbb{Q}}|\mathbb{Q}) \to \mathrm{GL}_n(\overline{\mathbb{Q}}_p)$ is an irreducible representation that is unramified except at a finite number of primes and which is not the Tate twist of an even representation that factors through a finite quotient group of $\mathrm{Gal}(\overline{\mathbb{Q}}|\mathbb{Q})$. It claims that in this case, $\rho$ is associated to a cuspidal newform if and only if $\rho$ is potentially semi-stable at $p$.
