= Non-Archimedean =

In mathematics and physics, non-Archimedean refers to something without the Archimedean property. This includes:

- Ultrametric space
  - in particular, a domain with non-Archimedean absolute value
  - notably, p-adic numbers
- Non-Archimedean ordered field, namely:
  - Levi-Civita field
  - Hyperreal numbers
  - Surreal numbers
  - Dehn planes
