= Higher local field =

Discrete valuation field

In mathematics, a higher (-dimensional) local field is an important example of a complete discrete valuation field. Such fields are also sometimes called multi-dimensional local fields.

On the usual local fields (typically completions of number fields or the quotient fields of local rings of algebraic curves) there is a unique surjective discrete valuation (of rank 1) associated to a choice of a local parameter of the fields, unless they are archimedean local fields such as the real numbers and complex numbers. Similarly, there is a discrete valuation of rank n on almost all n-dimensional local fields, associated to a choice of n local parameters of the field. In contrast to one-dimensional local fields, higher local fields have a sequence of residue fields. There are different integral structures on higher local fields, depending how many residue fields information one wants to take into account.

Geometrically, higher local fields appear via a process of localization and completion of local rings of higher dimensional schemes. Higher local fields are an important part of the subject of higher dimensional number theory, forming the appropriate collection of objects for local considerations.

== Definition ==
Finite fields have dimension 0 and complete discrete valuation fields with finite residue field have dimension one (it is natural to also define archimedean local fields such as R or C to have dimension 1), then we say a complete discrete valuation field has dimension n if its residue field has dimension n−1. Higher local fields are those of dimension greater than one, while one-dimensional local fields are the traditional local fields. We call the residue field of a finite-dimensional higher local field the 'first' residue field, its residue field is then the second residue field, and the pattern continues until we reach a finite field.

== Examples ==
Two-dimensional local fields are divided into the following classes:

- Fields of positive characteristic, they are formal power series in variable t over a one-dimensional local field, i.e. F_{q}((u))((t)).
- Equicharacteristic fields of characteristic zero, they are formal power series F((t)) over a one-dimensional local field F of characteristic zero.
- Mixed-characteristic fields, they are finite extensions of fields of type F{{t}}, F is a one-dimensional local field of characteristic zero. This field is defined as the set of formal power series, infinite in both directions, with coefficients from F such that the minimum of the valuation of the coefficients is an integer, and such that the valuation of the coefficients tend to zero as their index goes to minus infinity.
- Archimedean two-dimensional local fields, which are formal power series over the real numbers R or the complex numbers C.

== Constructions ==
Higher local fields appear in a variety of contexts. A geometric example is as follows. Given a surface over a finite field of characteristic p, a curve on the surface and a point on the curve, take the local ring at the point. Then, complete this ring, localise it at the curve and complete the resulting ring. Finally, take the quotient field. The result is a two-dimensional local field over a finite field.

There is also a construction using commutative algebra, which becomes technical for non-regular rings. The starting point is a Noetherian, regular, n-dimensional ring and a full flag of prime ideals such that their corresponding quotient ring is regular. A series of completions and localisations take place as above until an n-dimensional local field is reached.

== Topologies on higher local fields ==
One-dimensional local fields are usually considered in the valuation topology, in which the discrete valuation is used to define open sets. This will not suffice for higher dimensional local fields, since one needs to take into account the topology at the residue level too. Higher local fields can be endowed with appropriate topologies (not uniquely defined) which address this issue. Such topologies are not the topologies associated with discrete valuations of rank n, if n > 1. In dimension two and higher the additive group of the field becomes a topological group which is not locally compact and the base of the topology is not countable. The most surprising thing is that the multiplication is not continuous; however, it is sequentially continuous, which suffices for all reasonable arithmetic purposes. There are also iterated Ind–Pro approaches to replace topological considerations by more formal ones.

== Measure, integration and harmonic analysis on higher local fields ==
There is no translation invariant measure on two-dimensional local fields. Instead, there is a finitely additive translation invariant measure defined on the ring of sets generated by closed balls with respect to two-dimensional discrete valuations on the field, and taking values in formal power series R((X)) over reals. This measure is also countably additive in a certain refined sense. It can be viewed as higher Haar measure on higher local fields. The additive group of every higher local field is non-canonically self-dual, and one can define a higher Fourier transform on appropriate spaces of functions. This leads to higher harmonic analysis.

== Higher local class field theory ==
Local class field theory in dimension one has its analogues in higher dimensions. The appropriate replacement for the multiplicative group becomes the nth Milnor K-group, where n is the dimension of the field, which then appears as the domain of a reciprocity map to the Galois group of the maximal abelian extension over the field. Even better is to work with the quotient of the nth Milnor K-group by its subgroup of elements divisible by every positive integer. Due to Fesenko theorem, this quotient can also be viewed as the maximal separated topological quotient of the K-group endowed with appropriate higher dimensional topology. Higher local reciprocity homomorphism from this quotient of the nth Milnor K-group to the Galois group of the maximal abelian extension of the higher local field has many features similar to those of the one-dimensional local class field theory.

Higher local class field theory is compatible with class field theory at the residue field level, using the border map of Milnor K-theory to create a commutative diagram involving the reciprocity map on the level of the field and the residue field.

General higher local class field theory was developed by Kazuya Kato and by Ivan Fesenko. Higher local class field theory in positive characteristic was proposed by Aleksei Parshin.
