= Honda–Tate theorem =

In mathematics, the Honda–Tate theorem classifies abelian varieties over finite fields up to isogeny. It states that the isogeny classes of simple abelian varieties over a finite field of order q correspond, via the Frobenius endomorphism, to the conjugacy classes of Weil q-numbers, that is, algebraic integers all of whose conjugates have absolute value $\sqrt{q}$.

== Statement ==
Let $q = p^a$ be a power of a prime $p$. A Weil q-number is an algebraic integer $\pi$ such that $|\iota(\pi)| = \sqrt{q}$ for every embedding $\iota\colon \mathbb{Q}(\pi) \to \mathbb{C}$. Two Weil q-numbers are conjugate if they have the same minimal polynomial over $\mathbb{Q}$.

Let $A$ be a simple abelian variety over $\mathbb{F}_q$ and $\pi_A \in \operatorname{End}(A)$ its q-power Frobenius endomorphism. Since $A$ is simple, $\operatorname{End}(A) \otimes \mathbb{Q}$ is a division algebra, so $\pi_A$ generates a number field $\mathbb{Q}(\pi_A)$, in which it is an algebraic integer because $\operatorname{End}(A)$ is a finitely generated $\mathbb{Z}$-module. For every prime $\ell \neq p$, the conjugates of $\pi_A$ are the eigenvalues of $\pi_A$ acting on the rational Tate module $V_\ell(A)$, or equivalently of the Frobenius acting on the ℓ-adic cohomology group $H^1(A_{\overline{\mathbb{F}}_q}, \mathbb{Q}_\ell)$; by Weil (1948), they all have absolute value $\sqrt{q}$. Hence $\pi_A$ is a Weil q-number. If $\varphi\colon A \to B$ is an isogeny defined over $\mathbb{F}_q$, then $\varphi \circ \pi_A = \pi_B \circ \varphi$, so $\pi_A$ and $\pi_B$ are conjugate.

The Honda–Tate theorem states that $A \mapsto \pi_A$ induces a bijection

$$\{\text{simple abelian varieties over } \mathbb{F}_q\}/\text{isogeny over } \mathbb{F}_q \;\longleftrightarrow\; \{\text{Weil } q\text{-numbers}\}/\text{conjugacy}.$$

Since every abelian variety is isogenous to a product of simple abelian varieties, unique up to isogeny and permutation of the factors (Poincaré's complete reducibility theorem), this classifies all abelian varieties over $\mathbb{F}_q$ up to isogeny.

== History ==
Tate (1966) proved that for abelian varieties $A$, $B$ over $\mathbb{F}_q$ and $\ell \neq p$, the natural map $\operatorname{Hom}_{\mathbb{F}_q}(A, B) \otimes \mathbb{Z}_\ell \to \operatorname{Hom}_{\operatorname{Gal}}(T_\ell(A), T_\ell(B))$ is an isomorphism. It follows that simple abelian varieties with conjugate Frobenius endomorphisms are isogenous, so the map is injective. Tate also showed that, for $A$ simple, the center of $\operatorname{End}(A) \otimes \mathbb{Q}$ is $\mathbb{Q}(\pi_A)$. Taira Honda (1968) proved, using the theory of complex multiplication, that the map is surjective, and therefore a bijection. Tate (1971) gave an exposition of the proof, together with a description of the endomorphism algebra $\operatorname{End}(A) \otimes \mathbb{Q}$.
