= Norm group =

In number theory, a norm group is a group of the form $N_{L/K}(L^\times)$ where $L/K$ is a finite abelian extension of nonarchimedean local fields, and $N_{L/K}$ is the field norm. One of the main theorems in local class field theory states that the norm groups in $K^\times$ are precisely the open subgroups of $K^\times$ of finite index.

== See also ==
- Takagi existence theorem
