= Takeshi Saito =

Takeshi Saito may refer to:

- Takeshi Saito (ice hockey) (齊藤 毅, born 1981), Japanese ice hockey player
- Takeshi Saito (mathematician) (斎藤 毅, born 1961), Japanese mathematician
- Takeshi Saito (musician) (斎藤 毅, born 1959), Japanese violinist
