= Hodge–Tate module =

In mathematics, a Hodge–Tate module is an analogue of a Hodge structure over p-adic fields. Serre (1967) introduced and named Hodge–Tate structures using the results of Tate (1967) on p-divisible groups.

== Definition ==
Suppose that G is the absolute Galois group of a p-adic field K. Then G has a canonical cyclotomic character χ given by its action on the pth power roots of unity. Let C be the completion of the algebraic closure of K. Then a finite-dimensional vector space over C with a semi-linear action of the Galois group G is said to be of Hodge–Tate type if it is generated by the eigenvectors of integral powers of χ.

== See also ==
- p-adic Hodge theory
- Mumford–Tate group
