= Jean-Marc Fontaine =

French mathematician (1944–2019)

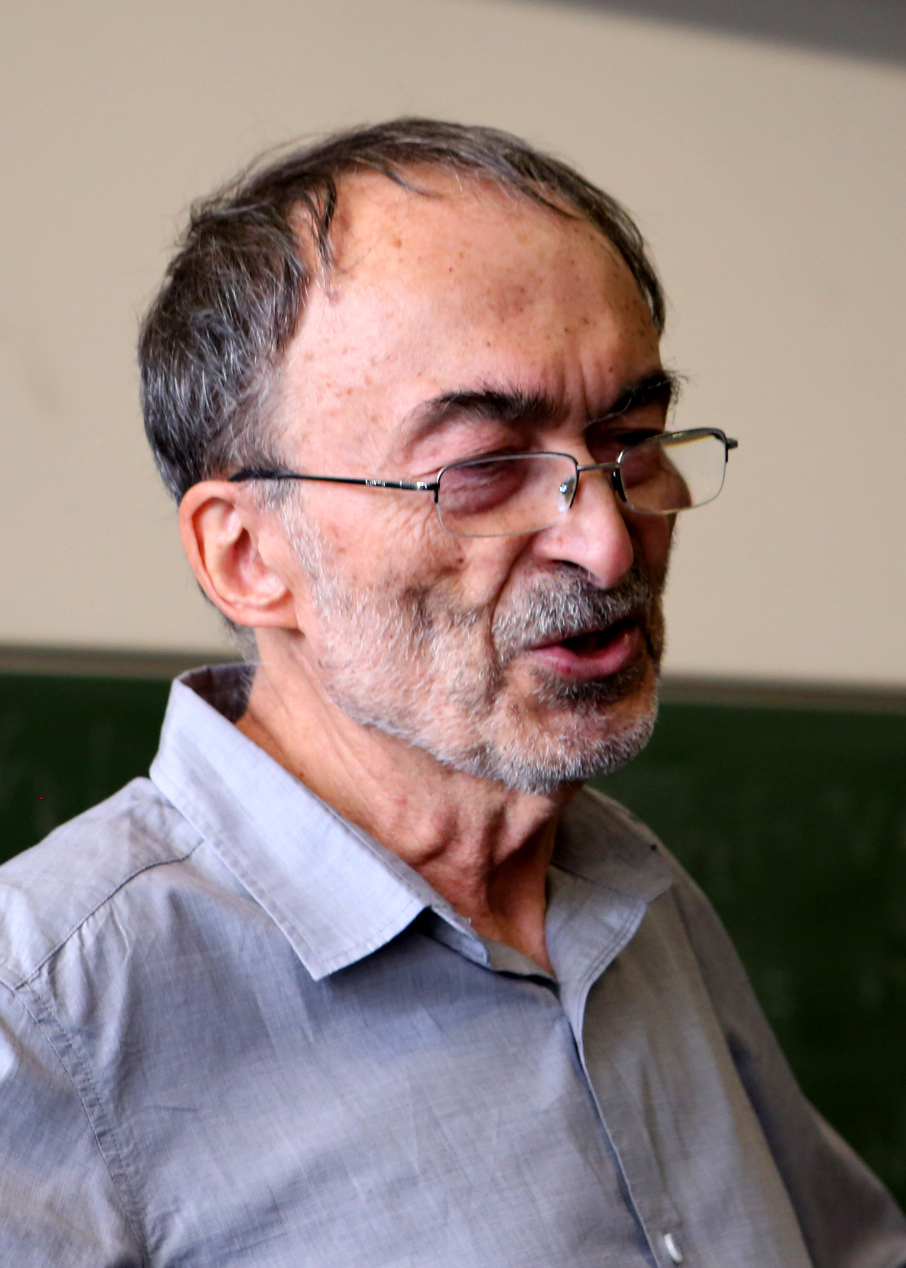
- Born: 13 March 1944; Boulogne-Billancourt
- Died: 29 January 2019 (aged 74)
- Scientific career
- Fields: Mathematics
- Workplaces: Paris-Sud 11 University
- Doctoral advisor: Jean-Pierre Serre
- Doctoral students: Christophe Breuil; Pierre Colmez; Jean-Pierre Wintenberger

Jean-Marc Fontaine (13 March 1944 – 29 January 2019) was a French mathematician. He was one of the founders of p-adic Hodge theory. He was a professor at Paris-Sud 11 University from 1988 to his death.

== Life ==
In 1962 Fontaine entered the École Polytechnique, from 1965 to 1971 was a researcher at CNRS and received his doctorate in 1972. From 1971 to 72 he was at the University of Paris VI and from 1972 to 1988 was at the University of Grenoble (initially as Maître de Conferences, but later a professor). From 1989 he was professor at the University of Paris-Sud XI in Orsay.

Among his first works was the classification of p-divisible groups (= Barsotti–Tate group) over the ring of integers of a local field and the field of p-adic periods, a p-adic analogue of the field of complex numbers. Fontaine is one of the founders of $p$-adic Hodge theory. He proved that there are no non-trivial abelian varieties over the rational numbers with good reduction everywhere (Il n'y a pas de variété abélienne sur Z, Inventiones Mathematicae vol. 81, 1985, p. 515). He introduced the concept of geometric Galois representation of the Galois group of a number field. He also worked on Bloch-Kato conjectures.

In 1984 he received the Prix Carrière from the French Academy of Sciences. Beginning in 2002 he was a member of the French Academy of Sciences. In 2002 he was awarded the Gay-Lussac-Humboldt Prize. He was an invited speaker at the International Congress of Mathematicians in Warsaw 1983 (Représentations p-adiques) and Beijing 2002 (analyse p-adique et représentations galoisiennes).

His students included Christophe Breuil, Pierre Colmez, and Jean-Pierre Wintenberger.

== Writings ==
- "Groupes p-divisibles sur les corps locaux - no. 47-48" (PDF). Société Mathématique de France, Paris. 1977.
  - Fontaine, Jean-Marc (1985). "Il n'y a pas de variété abélienne sur Z". Inventiones Mathematicae. 81 (3): 515–538. doi:10.1007/BF01388584. S2CID 122218539.
- "Périodes p-adiques - Séminaire de Bures, 1988 - Volume (1994) no. 223" (PDF).
  - Fontaine, Jean-Marc (2020). "Périodes p-adiques (Séminaire de Bures, 1988) - réédition 2020". Astérisque. 220. doi:10.24033/ast.1122. S2CID 241559124.
- With Pierre Berthelot, Luc Illusie, Kazuya Kato, Michael Rapoport : Cohomologies p-adiques et Arithmétiques applications. Astérisque Bd.278/279, 2002.
- With Barry Mazur, Geometric Galois representations

== Prizes and distinctions ==
- Cours Peccot du Collège de France (1975)
- Prix Carrière de l'Académie des sciences (1984)
- Prix Humboldt-Gay Lussac de la foundation Alexander von Humboldt (2002)

== See also ==
- Fontaine–Mazur conjecture
- Fontaine's period rings
