= B-admissible representation =

In mathematics, the formalism of B-admissible representations provides constructions of full Tannakian subcategories of the category of representations of a group G on finite-dimensional vector spaces over a given field E. In this theory, B is chosen to be a so-called (E, G)-regular ring, i.e. an E-algebra with an E-linear action of G satisfying certain conditions given below. This theory is most prominently used in p-adic Hodge theory to define important subcategories of p-adic Galois representations of the absolute Galois group of local and global fields.

== (E, G)-rings and the functor D ==
Let G be a group and E a field. Let Rep(G) denote a non-trivial strictly full subcategory of the Tannakian category of E-linear representations of G on finite-dimensional vector spaces over E stable under subobjects, quotient objects, direct sums, tensor products, and duals.

An (E, G)-ring is a commutative ring B that is an E-algebra with an E-linear action of G. Let F = B^{G} be the G-invariants of B. The covariant functor D_{B} : Rep(G) → Mod_{F} defined by

$$D_B(V):=(B\otimes_EV)^G$$

is E-linear (Mod_{F} denotes the category of F-modules). The inclusion of D_{B}(V) in B ⊗_{E}V induces a homomorphism

$$\alpha_{B,V}:B\otimes_FD_B(V)\longrightarrow B\otimes_EV$$

called the comparison morphism.

== Regular (E, G)-rings and B-admissible representations ==
An (E, G)-ring B is called regular if

1. B is reduced;
2. for every V in Rep(G), α_{B,V} is injective;
3. every b ∈ B for which the line bE is G-stable is invertible in B.

The third condition implies F is a field. If B is a field, it is automatically regular.

When B is regular,

$$\dim_FD_B(V)\leq\dim_EV$$

with equality if, and only if, α_{B,V} is an isomorphism.

A representation V ∈ Rep(G) is called B-admissible if α_{B,V} is an isomorphism. The full subcategory of B-admissible representations, denoted Rep_{B}(G), is Tannakian.

If B has extra structure, such as a filtration or an E-linear endomorphism, then D_{B}(V) inherits this structure and the functor D_{B} can be viewed as taking values in the corresponding category.

== Examples ==
- Let K be a field of characteristic p (a prime), and K_{s} a separable closure of K. If E = F_{p} (the finite field with p elements) and G = Gal(K_{s}/K) (the absolute Galois group of K), then B = K_{s} is a regular (E, G)-ring. On K_{s} there is an injective Frobenius endomorphism σ : K_{s} → K_{s} sending x to x^{p}. Given a representation G → GL(V) for some finite-dimensional F_{p}-vector space V, $D=D_{K_s}(V)$ is a finite-dimensional vector space over F=(K_{s})^{G} = K which inherits from B = K_{s} an injective function φ_{D} : D → D which is σ-semilinear (i.e. φ(ad) = σ(a)φ(d) for all a ∈ K and all d ∈ D). The K_{s}-admissible representations are the continuous ones (where G has the Krull topology and V has the discrete topology). In fact, $D_{K_s}$ is an equivalence of categories between the K_{s}-admissible representations (i.e. continuous ones) and the finite-dimensional vector spaces over K equipped with an injective σ-semilinear φ.

== Potentially B-admissible representations ==
A potentially B-admissible representation captures the idea of a representation that becomes B-admissible when restricted to some subgroup of G.
