= Vostokov =

Vostokov (Russian: Востоков) is a Russian surname. The feminine form is Vostokova (Russian: Востокова). Notable people with the surname include:

- Alexander Vostokov (1781–1864), Russian philologist
- Sergei Vostokov (1945–2025), Russian mathematician

== See also ==
- Iron Maiden, born Melina Vostokova, a Marvel Comics supervillain
