= Tate curve =

In mathematics, the Tate curve is a curve defined over the ring of formal power series $\mathbb{Z}[[q]]$ with integer coefficients. Over the open subscheme where q is invertible, the Tate curve is an elliptic curve.

The Tate curve can also be defined for q as an element of a complete field of norm less than 1, in which case the formal power series converge.

The Tate curve was introduced by John Tate (1995) in a 1959 manuscript originally titled "Rational Points on Elliptic Curves Over Complete Fields"; he did not publish his results until many years later, and his work first appeared in Roquette (1970).

== Definition ==
The Tate curve is the projective plane curve over the ring $\mathbb{Z}[[q]]$ of formal power series with integer coefficients given (in an affine open subset of the projective plane) by the equation

$$y^2+xy=x^3+a_4x+a_6$$

where

$$-a_4=5\sum_n \frac{n^3q^n}{1-q^n} = 5q+45q^2+140q^3+\cdots$$
$$-a_6=\sum_{n}\frac{7n^5+5n^3}{12}\times\frac{q^n}{1-q^n} = q+23q^2+154q^3+\cdots$$

are power series with integer coefficients.

== The Tate curve over a complete field ==
Suppose that the field $k$ is complete with respect to some absolute value | |, and $q$ is a non-zero element of the field $k$ with $|q|<1$. Then the series above all converge, and define an elliptic curve over $k$. If in addition $q$ is non-zero then there is an isomorphism of groups from $k^*/q^{\mathbb{Z}}$ to this elliptic curve, taking $w$ to $(x(w),y(w))$ for $w$ not a power of $q$, where

$$x(w)= -y(w)-y(w^{-1})$$
$$y(w) = \sum_{m \in \mathbb{Z}}\frac{(q^mw)^2}{(1-q^mw)^3} + \sum_{m \ge 1} \frac{q^m}{(1-q^m)^2}$$

and taking powers of $q$ to the point at infinity of the elliptic curve. The series $x(w)$ and $y(w)$ are not formal power series in $w$.

== Intuitive example ==
In the case of the curve over the complete field, $k^*/q^\mathbb{Z}$, the easiest case to visualize is $\mathbb{C}^*/q^\mathbb{Z}$, where $q^\mathbb{Z}$ is the discrete subgroup generated by one multiplicative period $e^{2 \pi i \tau}$, where the period $\tau = \omega_1/\omega_2$. Note that $\mathbb{C}^*$ is isomorphic to ${(\mathbb{C},+)}/ (\mathbb{Z},+)$, where $(\mathbb{C},+)$ is the complex numbers under addition.

To see why the Tate curve morally corresponds to a torus when the field is $\mathbb{C}$ with the usual norm, $q$ is already singly periodic; modding out by $q$'s integral powers you are modding out $\mathbb{C}$ by $\mathbb{Z}^2$, which is a torus. In other words, we have an annulus, and we glue inner and outer edges.

But the annulus does not correspond to the circle minus a point: the annulus is the set of complex numbers between two consecutive powers of $q$; say all complex numbers with magnitude between 1 and $q$. That gives us two circles, i.e., the inner and outer edges of an annulus.

The image of the torus given here is a bunch of inlaid circles getting narrower and narrower as they approach the origin.

This is slightly different from the usual method beginning with a flat sheet of paper, $\mathbb{C}$, and gluing together the sides to make a cylinder $\mathbb{C}/\mathbb{Z}$, and then gluing together the edges of the cylinder to make a torus, $\mathbb{C}/\mathbb{Z}^2$.

This is slightly oversimplified. The Tate curve is really a curve over a formal power series ring rather than a curve over C. Intuitively, it is a family of curves depending on a formal parameter. When that formal parameter is zero it degenerates to a pinched torus, and when it is nonzero it is a torus).

== Properties ==
The j-invariant of the Tate curve is given by a power series in q with leading term q^{−1}. Over a p-adic local field, therefore, j is non-integral and the Tate curve has semistable reduction of multiplicative type. Conversely, every semistable elliptic curve over a local field is isomorphic to a Tate curve (up to quadratic twist).
