= Zarhin trick =

In mathematics, the Zarhin trick is a method for eliminating the polarization of abelian varieties A by observing that the abelian variety A^{4} × Â^{4} is principally polarized. The method was introduced by Zarhin (1974) in his proof of the Tate conjecture over global fields of positive characteristic.
