= Local duality =

In mathematics, local duality may refer to:

- Local Tate duality of modules over a Galois group of a local field
- Grothendieck local duality of modules over local rings
