= Dinesh Thakur (mathematician) =

Indian mathematician (born 1961)

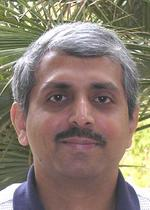
- Born: 1961 (age 64–65); India
- Education: Harvard University University of Bombay
- Scientific career
- Fields: Mathematics
- Workplaces: University of Rochester
- Doctoral advisor: John Tate

Dinesh S. Thakur (born 1961) is an Indian mathematician and a professor of mathematics at University of Rochester. Before moving to Rochester, Thakur was a professor at University of Arizona. His main research interest is number theory.

== Early life ==
Thakur was born in Mumbai, India. He attended Balmohan Vidyamandir School in Bombay and completed his undergraduate education at Ruia College, University of Bombay. He got his Ph.D. in 1987 at Harvard University under the guidance of Professor John Tate.

== Career ==
Thakur has spent three and half years at Institute for Advanced Study, Princeton and three years at Tata Institute of Fundamental Research, Bombay. He held positions at University of Minnesota and University of Michigan. He moved to University of Arizona in 1993. He joined University of Rochester in July 2013. Thakur wrote a research monograph Function Field Arithmetic. Thakur has been serving on the editorial boards of Journal of Number Theory, International Journal of Number Theory, and P-adic Numbers, Ultrametric Analysis and Applications. Thakur is a founding member of-and for 15 years a participant in-the NSF-funded Southwest Center for Arithmetic Geometry and the Arizona Winter School.

He was elected as a member of the 2017 class of Fellows of the American Mathematical Society "for contributions to the arithmetic of function fields, exposition, and service to the mathematical community".

== Work ==
His main work has been in number theory, where he has been instrumental in developing various aspects of function field arithmetic and arithmetic geometry.
