= William Messing =

American mathematician

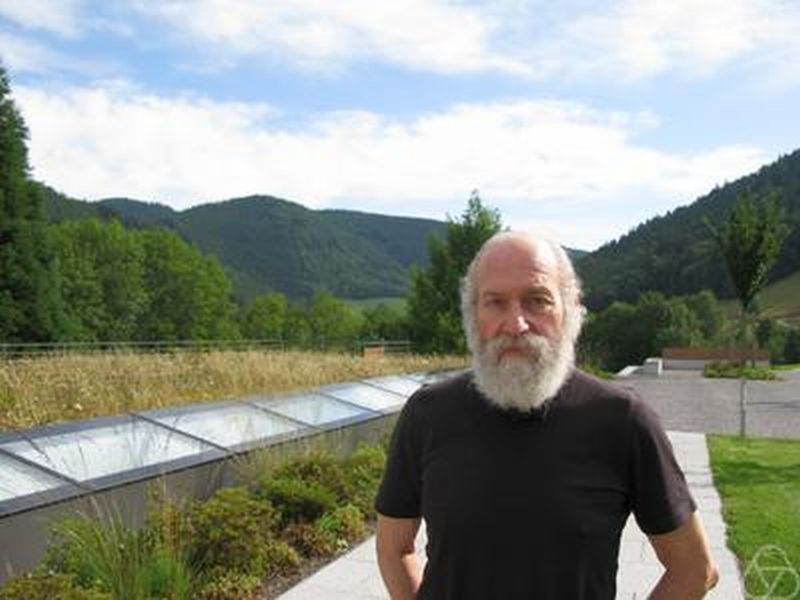
William Messing in Oberwolfach, 2008

William Messing is an American mathematician who works in the field of arithmetic algebraic geometry.

Messing received his doctorate in 1971 at Princeton University under the supervisions of Alexander Grothendieck (and Nicholas Katz) with his thesis The Crystals Associated to Barsotti–Tate Groups: With Applications to Abelian Schemes. In 1972, he was a C.L.E. Moore instructor at Massachusetts Institute of Technology. He is currently professor emeritus at the University of Minnesota (Minneapolis).

In his thesis, Messing elaborated on Grothendieck's 1970 lecture at the International Congress of Mathematicians in Nice on p-divisible groups (Barsotti–Tate groups) that are important in algebraic geometry in prime characteristic, which were introduced in the 1950s by Dieudonné in his study of Lie algebras over fields of finite characteristic. Messing worked together with Pierre Berthelot, Barry Mazur, and Aise Johan de Jong.

== Writings ==
- Pierre Berthelot, Messing, Theorie de Dieudonné cristalline I, Journées de Geometrie Algebrique de Rennes, 1978, volume 1, pp. 17–37, Asterisque, volume 63, 1979
- Pierre Berthelot, Lawrence Breen, Messing, Theorie de Dieudonné cristalline II, Springer Lecture Notes in Mathematics, Volume 930, 1982
- With Berthelot, Theorie de Dieudonné cristalline III, in Paul Cartier and others, Grothendieck Festschrift, Volume 1, 1990, Springer, p. 173
- Barry Mazur, Messing, Universal extensions and one dimensional cristalline cohomology, Springer Lecture Notes in Mathematics, Volume 370, 1974
- Messing, The crystals associated to Barsotti–Tate groups: with applications to abelian schemes, Springer Lecture Notes in Mathematics, Volume 264, 1972
