= Jonathan Lubin =

American mathematician

Jonathan Darby Lubin
- Born: August 10, 1936 (age 90); Staten Island, NY
- Education: Harvard University
- Scientific career
- Fields: Mathematics
- Workplaces: Brown University
- Doctoral advisor: John Tate

Jonathan Darby Lubin (born August 10, 1936, in Staten Island, New York) is a professor emeritus of mathematics at Brown University. He received an A.B. from Columbia College in 1957 and a Ph.D. from Harvard University in 1963 under the direction of John Tate. He taught at Bowdoin College from 1962–1967 and at Brown University from 1967–2000.

He and Tate introduced Lubin–Tate formal group laws and used them to construct explicit local class field theory.
