= Ivan Fesenko =

Russian mathematician

- Born: St Petersburg, Russia
- Education: Saint Petersburg State University
- Known for: Number theory
- Awards: Petersburg Mathematical Society Prize
- Scientific career
- Fields: Mathematician
- Workplaces: University of Nottingham
- Doctoral advisor: Sergei Vostokov; Alexander Merkurjev
- Doctoral students: Caucher Birkar
- Website: www.maths.nottingham.ac.uk/personal/ibf

Ivan Fesenko is a mathematician working in number theory and its interaction with other areas of modern mathematics. He is a distinguished professor of mathematics at Westlake University in China.

== Education and career ==
Fesenko was educated at St. Petersburg State University where he was awarded a PhD in 1987.

After continuing at St. Petersburg State University as assistant and associate professor, he became professor in pure mathematics at the University of Nottingham in the UK. He moved to Westlake University in China as a distinguished professor of mathematics in 2023.

== Research ==
Fesenko was awarded the Prize of the Petersburg Mathematical Society in 1992.

He contributed to several areas of number theory such as class field theory and its generalizations, as well as to various related developments in pure mathematics.

Fesenko contributed to explicit formulas for the generalized Hilbert symbol on local fields and higher local field, higher class field theory, p-class field theory, arithmetic noncommutative local class field theory.

He coauthored a textbook on local fields and a volume on higher local fields.

Fesenko discovered a higher Haar measure and integration on various higher local and adelic objects. (Note: Fesenko, I. (2003). "Analysis on arithmetic schemes. I". Documenta Mathematica: 261–284. ISBN 978-3-936609-21-9.) He pioneered the study of zeta functions in higher dimensions by developing his theory of higher adelic zeta integrals. These integrals are defined using the higher Haar measure and objects from higher class field theory. Fesenko generalized the Iwasawa-Tate theory from 1-dimensional global fields to 2-dimensional arithmetic surfaces such as proper regular models of elliptic curves over global fields. His theory led to three further developments.

The first development is the study of functional equation and meromorphic continuation of the Hasse zeta function of a proper regular model of an elliptic curve over a global field. This study led Fesenko to introduce a new mean-periodicity correspondence between the arithmetic zeta functions and mean-periodic elements of the space of smooth functions on the real line of not more than exponential growth at infinity. This correspondence can be viewed as a weaker version of the Langlands correspondence, where L-functions and replaced by zeta functions and automorphicity is replaced by mean-periodicity. This work was followed by a joint work with Suzuki and Ricotta.

The second development is an application to the generalized Riemann hypothesis, which in this higher theory is reduced to a certain positivity property of small derivatives of the boundary function and to the properties of the spectrum of the Laplace transform of the boundary function.

The third development is a higher adelic study of relations between the arithmetic and analytic ranks of an elliptic curve over a global field, which in conjectural form are stated in the Birch and Swinnerton-Dyer conjecture for the zeta function of elliptic surfaces. This new method uses FIT theory, two adelic structures: the geometric additive adelic structure and the arithmetic multiplicative adelic structure and an interplay between them motivated by higher class field theory. These two adelic structures have some similarity to two symmetries in inter-universal Teichmüller theory of Mochizuki.

His contributions include his analysis of class field theories and their main generalizations.

=== Other contributions ===
In his study of infinite ramification theory, Fesenko introduced a torsion free hereditarily just infinite closed subgroup of the Nottingham group.

Fesenko played an active role in organizing the study of inter-universal Teichmüller theory of Shinichi Mochizuki. He is the author of a survey and a general article on this theory. He co-organized two international workshops on IUT. (Note: "Oxford Workshop on IUT theory of Shinichi Mochizuki". December 2015. Archived from the original on 2017-03-28.)
