= Volkenborn integral =

Mathematical integration method

In mathematics, in the field of p-adic analysis, the Volkenborn integral is a method of integration for p-adic functions.

== Definition ==
Let :$f:\Z_p\to \Complex_p$ be a function from the p-adic integers taking values in the p-adic numbers. The Volkenborn integral is defined by the limit, if it exists:

$$\int_{\Z_p} f(x) \, {\rm d}x = \lim_{n \to \infty} \frac{1}{p^n} \sum_{x=0}^{p^n-1} f(x).$$

More generally, if

$$R_n = \left\{\left. x = \sum_{i=r}^{n-1} b_i p^i \right | b_i=0, \ldots, p-1 \text{ for } r<n \right\}$$

then

$$\int_K f(x) \, {\rm d}x = \lim_{n \to \infty} \frac{1}{p^n} \sum_{x \in R_n \cap K} f(x).$$

This integral was defined by Arnt Volkenborn.

== Examples ==
$$\int_{\Z_p} 1 \, {\rm d}x = 1$$
$$\int_{\Z_p} x \, {\rm d}x = -\frac{1}{2}$$
$$\int_{\Z_p} x^2 \, {\rm d}x = \frac{1}{6}$$
$$\int_{\Z_p} x^k \, {\rm d}x = B_k$$

where $B_k$ is the k-th Bernoulli number.

The above four examples can be easily checked by direct use of the definition and Faulhaber's formula.

$$\int_{\Z_p} {x \choose k} \, {\rm d}x = \frac{(-1)^k}{k+1}$$
$$\int_{\Z_p} (1 + a)^x \, {\rm d}x = \frac{\log(1+a)}{a}$$
$$\int_{\Z_p} e^{a x} \, {\rm d}x = \frac{a}{e^a-1}$$

The last two examples can be formally checked by expanding in the Taylor series and integrating term-wise.

$$\int_{\Z_p} \log_p(x+u) \, {\rm d}u = \psi_p(x)$$

with $\log_p$ the p-adic logarithmic function and $\psi_p$ the p-adic digamma function.

== Properties ==
$$\int_{\Z_p} f(x+m) \, {\rm d}x = \int_{\Z_p} f(x) \, {\rm d}x+ \sum_{x=0}^{m-1} f'(x)$$

From this it follows that the Volkenborn-integral is not translation invariant.

If $P^t = p^t \Z_p$ then

$$\int_{P^t} f(x) \, {\rm d}x = \frac{1}{p^t} \int_{\Z_p} f(p^t x) \, {\rm d}x$$

== Origin ==
The idea of integrating p-adic functions was initially proposed by F. Thomas and François Bruhat. However, the definition of their translation-invariant p-adic integral proved too restrictive for analytical and number-theoretical purposes. Arnt Volkenborn developed the generalized p-adic integral, later named after him, in his 1971 dissertation at the University of Cologne. The Volkenborn integral allows integration of all locally analytic functions, such as Laurent series. It is used in the computation of the generalized p-adic Bernoulli numbers (like in the examples above) and other p-adic functions.

== See also ==
- p-adic distribution
