= Tate topology =

In mathematics, the Tate topology is a Grothendieck topology of the space of maximal ideals of a k-affinoid algebra, whose open sets are the admissible open subsets and whose coverings are the admissible open coverings.
