= Nottingham group =

In the mathematical field of infinite group theory, the Nottingham group is the group J(F_{p}) or N(F_{p}) consisting of formal power series t + a_{2}t^{2}+... with coefficients in F_{p}. The group multiplication is given by formal composition also called substitution. That is, if

$$f = t+ \sum_{n=2}^\infty a_n t^n$$

and if $g$ is another element, then

$$gf = f(g) = g+ \sum_{n=2}^\infty a_n g^n$$.

The group multiplication is not abelian. The group was studied by number theorists as the group of wild automorphisms of the local field F_{p}((t)) and by group theorists including D. Johnson (1988) and the name "Nottingham group" refers to his former domicile.

This group is a finitely generated pro-p-group, of finite width. For every finite group of order a power of p there is a closed subgroup of the Nottingham group isomorphic to that finite group.
