= Valuation =

Valuation may refer to:

== Economics ==
- Valuation (finance), the determination of the economic value of an asset or liability
  - Real estate appraisal, sometimes called property valuation (especially in British English), the appraisal of land or buildings
- A distinction between real prices and ideal prices in Marxist theory.
- The term valuation function is often used as a synonym to utility function.
- The sociology of valuation also takes economic valuation practices as an object of study.
- Valuation: Measuring and Managing the Value of Companies

== Mathematics ==
- Valuation (algebra), a measure of multiplicity
  - p-adic valuation, a special case
- Valuation (geometry), a generalization of finitely-additive measures
- Valuation (logic), an operation on well-formed formulas with the semantics of evaluation
- Valuation (measure theory), a tool for constructing outer measures

== Other uses ==
- Valuation (ethics), the determination of the ethic or philosophic value of an object
- For personal valuation, see dignity
