= Taira Honda =

Japanese mathematician

Taira Honda (本田 平, Honda Taira, 2 June 1932 Fukui, Japan – 15 May 1975 Osaka, Japan) was a Japanese mathematician working on number theory who proved the Honda–Tate theorem classifying abelian varieties over finite fields.
