= Absolute value (algebra) =

Function which measures the "size" of elements in a field or integral domain

In algebra, an absolute value (Note: Valuation, norm and magnitude are related concepts that must not be confused with the subject of this article, although they may coincide in some cases. For example, an absolute value is a norm, but norms are defined on vector spaces, and a field norm is generally not an absolute value. A valuation is often the logarithm of an absolute value. "Magnitude" may be considered as a synonym of absolute value only in the usual real and complex cases.) is a function that generalizes the usual absolute value. More precisely, if D is a field or (more generally) an integral domain, an absolute value on D is a function, commonly denoted $|x|,$ from D to the real numbers satisfying:

•	$\left|x\right|\geq0$	(non-negativity)
•	$\left|x\right|=0$ if and only if $x=0$	(positive definiteness)
•	$\left|xy\right|=\left|x\right|\left|y\right|$	(multiplicativity)
•	$\left|x+y\right|\leq\left|x\right|+\left|y\right|$	(triangle inequality)

It follows from the axioms that $|1| = 1,$ $|-1| = 1,$ and $|-x|=|x|$ for every $x$. Furthermore, for every positive integer n, $|n|\le n,$ where the leftmost n denotes the sum of n summands equal to the identity element of D.

The classical absolute value and its square root are examples of absolute values, but the square of the classical absolute value is not, as it does not fulfill the triangular inequality.

An absolute value induces a metric (and thus a topology) on D by setting $d(x,y) = |x - y|.$

== Examples ==
- The standard absolute value on the integers, the rationals and the real numbers: $|x|=x$ for $x\geq 0$ and $|x|=-x$ for $x<0$.
- The standard absolute value or modulus on the complex numbers: $|a+bi|=\sqrt{a^2+b^2}$ for $a,b\in\mathbb{R}$.
- The p-adic absolute value on the rational numbers, where p is a fixed prime: $|0|_p=0$ and for $x\ne 0$ we set $|x|_p=p^{-n}$, where n is the unique integer such that $x=p^n \frac{a}{b}$ and a and b are two integers coprime with p.
- The p-adic absolute value on the p-adic numbers, arising from the completion (see § Completions below) of the rationals with the absolute value defined above.
- If $F(x)$ is the field of rational fractions over a field F in the variable x and $P$ is a fixed irreducible polynomial over F, the P-adic absolute value on $F(x)$ is defined as follows: $|0|_P=0$ and for $f\ne 0$ we set $|f|_P=2^{-n},$ where n is the unique integer such that $f = P^n \frac{G}{H},$ where G and H are two polynomials, both coprime with P.
- Absolute values are used to define or characterize global and local fields.

== Types of absolute value ==
The trivial absolute value is the absolute value with |x| = 0 when x = 0 and |x| = 1 otherwise. Every integral domain can carry at least the trivial absolute value. The trivial value is the only possible absolute value on a finite field because any non-zero element can be raised to some power to yield 1.

If an absolute value satisfies the stronger property |x + y| ≤ max(|x|, |y|) for all x and y, then |x| is called an ultrametric or non-Archimedean absolute value, and otherwise an Archimedean absolute value.

== Places ==
If |x|_{1} and |x|_{2} are two absolute values on the same integral domain D, then the two absolute values are equivalent if |x|_{1} < 1 if and only if |x|_{2} < 1 for all x. If two nontrivial absolute values are equivalent, then for some exponent e we have |x|_{1}^{e} = |x|_{2} for all x. Raising an absolute value to a power less than 1 results in another absolute value, but raising to a power greater than 1 does not necessarily result in an absolute value. (For instance, squaring the usual absolute value on the real numbers yields a function which is not an absolute value because it violates the rule |x+y| ≤ |x|+|y|.) Absolute values up to equivalence, or in other words, an equivalence class of absolute values, is called a place.

Since the ordinary absolute value and the p-adic absolute values are absolute values according to the definition above, these define places.

Ostrowski's theorem states that the nontrivial places of the rational numbers Q are the ordinary absolute value and the p-adic absolute value for each prime p (see the third example above).

== Valuations ==
If for some ultrametric absolute value and any base b > 1, we define ν(x) = −log_{b}|x| for x ≠ 0 and ν(0) = ∞, where ∞ is ordered to be greater than all real numbers, then we obtain a function from D to R ∪ {∞}, with the following properties:

- ν(x) = ∞ ⇒ x = 0,
- ν(xy) = ν(x) + ν(y),
- ν(x + y) ≥ min(ν(x), ν(y)).

Such a function is known as a valuation in the terminology of Bourbaki, but other authors use the term valuation for absolute value and then say exponential valuation instead of valuation.

== Completions ==
Given an integral domain D with an absolute value, we can define the Cauchy sequences of elements of D with respect to the absolute value by requiring that for every ε > 0 there is a positive integer N such that for all integers m, n > N one has |x_{m} − x_{n}| < ε. Cauchy sequences form a ring under pointwise addition and multiplication. One can also define null sequences as sequences (a_{n}) of elements of D such that |a_{n}| converges to zero. Null sequences are a prime ideal in the ring of Cauchy sequences, and the quotient ring is therefore an integral domain. The domain D is embedded in this quotient ring, called the completion of D with respect to the absolute value |x|.

Since fields are integral domains, this is also a construction for the completion of a field with respect to an absolute value. To show that the result is a field, and not just an integral domain, we can either show that null sequences form a maximal ideal, or else construct the inverse directly. The latter can be easily done by taking, for all nonzero elements of the quotient ring, a sequence starting from a point beyond the last zero element of the sequence. Any nonzero element of the quotient ring will differ by a null sequence from such a sequence, and by taking pointwise inversion we can find a representative inverse element.

Another theorem of Alexander Ostrowski has it that any field complete with respect to an Archimedean absolute value is isomorphic to either the real or the complex numbers, and the valuation is equivalent to the usual one. The Gelfand-Tornheim theorem states that any field with an Archimedean valuation is isomorphic to a subfield of C, the valuation being equivalent to the usual absolute value on C.

== Fields and integral domains ==
If D is an integral domain with absolute value |x|, then we may extend the definition of the absolute value to the field of fractions of D by setting

$$|x/y| = |x|/|y|.\,$$

On the other hand, if F is a field with ultrametric absolute value |x|, then the set of elements of F such that |x| ≤ 1 defines a valuation ring, which is a subring D of F such that for every nonzero element x of F, at least one of x or x^{−1} belongs to D. Since F is a field, D has no zero divisors and is an integral domain. It has a unique maximal ideal consisting of all x such that |x| < 1, and is therefore a local ring.
