= Sergei Vostokov =

Russian mathematician (1945–2025)

- Сергей Востоков
- Born: 13 April 1945; Leningrad, Russian SFSR, USSR
- Died: 7 March 2025 (aged 79)
- Education: Saint Petersburg University
- Known for: explicit formulas for the Hilbert symbol, Vostokov symbol
- Awards: Chebyshev Prize (2014)
- Scientific career
- Fields: Mathematics
- Workplaces: Saint Petersburg University
- Doctoral students: Ivan Fesenko

Sergei Vladimirovich Vostokov (Russian: Сергей Владимирович Востоков; 13 April 1945 – 7 March 2025) was a Russian mathematician who made major contributions to local number theory. He was a professor at St. Petersburg State University.

== Life and work ==
Vostokov developed an important class of explicit formulas for the Hilbert symbol on local fields, which had a wide range of applications in number theory.

His formulas generalize to formal groups. A generalization of his explicit formula to higher local fields is called the Vostokov symbol. It plays an important role in higher local class field theory.

Vostokov died on 7 March 2025, at the age of 79.

== Awards ==
For his 60th birthday, two special volumes of St Petersburg Mathematical Society of Vostokov were published in Russian and English by the American Mathematical Society.

In 2014, Vostokov was awarded the Chebyshev Prize.

== Bibliography ==
=== Books ===
- Fesenko, Ivan B.; Vostokov, S. V. (17 July 2002). Local Fields and Their Extensions: Second Edition. American Mathematical Society. ISBN 978-0-8218-3259-2.
