= Fontaine's period rings =

In mathematics, Fontaine's period rings are a collection of commutative rings first defined by Jean-Marc Fontaine that are used to classify $p$-adic Galois representations.

== The ring B_{dR} ==
The ring $\mathbf{B}_{dR}$ is defined as follows. Let $\C_p$ denote the completion of $\overline{\Q_p}$. Let

$$\tilde{\mathbf{E}}^+ = \varprojlim_{x\mapsto x^p} \mathcal{O}_{\C_p}/(p).$$

An element of $\tilde{\mathbf{E}}^+$ is a sequence $(x_1,x_2,\ldots)$ of elements $x_i\in \mathcal{O}_{\C_p}/(p)$ such that $x_{i+1}^p \equiv x_i \!\!\!\pmod p$. There is a natural projection map $f:\tilde{\mathbf{E}}^+ \to \mathcal{O}_{\C_p}/(p)$ given by $f(x_1,x_2,\dotsc) = x_1$. There is also a multiplicative (but not additive) map $t:\tilde{\mathbf{E}}^+\to \mathcal{O}_{\C_p}$ defined by

$$t(x_1,x_2,\dotsc) = \lim_{i\to \infty} \tilde x_i^{p^i}$$,

where the $\tilde x_i$ are arbitrary lifts of the $x_i$ to $\mathcal{O}_{\C_p}$. The composite of $t$ with the projection $\mathcal{O}_{\C_p}\to \mathcal{O}_{\C_p}/(p)$ is just $f$.

The general theory of Witt vectors yields a unique ring homomorphism $\theta:W(\tilde{\mathbf{E}}^+) \to \mathcal{O}_{\C_p}$ such that $\theta([x]) = t(x)$ for all $x\in \tilde{\mathbf{E}}^+$, where $[x]$ denotes the Teichmüller representative of $x$. The ring $\mathbf{B}_{dR}^+$ is defined to be completion of $\tilde{\mathbf{B}}^+ = W(\tilde{\mathbf{E}}^+)[1/p]$ with respect to the ideal $\ker( \theta : \tilde{\mathbf{B}}^+ \to \C_p)$. Finally, the field $\mathbf{B}_{dR}$ is just the field of fractions of $\mathbf{B}_{dR}^+$.
