= Takeshi Saito (mathematician) =

Japanese mathematician

Takeshi Saito (斎藤 毅 Saitō Takeshi, born 11 September 1961) is a Japanese mathematician, specializing in some areas of number theory and algebraic geometry. His thesis advisor was Kazuya Kato.

Saito was an invited speaker of the International Congress of Mathematicians in 2010.

== Selected publications ==
=== Articles ===
- Saito, Takeshi (1987). "Vanishing Cycles and Geometry of Curves Over a Discrete Valuation Ring". American Journal of Mathematics. 109 (6): 1043–1085. doi:10.2307/2374585. ISSN 0002-9327. JSTOR 2374585.
- Saitō, Takeshi (1993). "Determinant representation, Jacobi sum and de Rham discriminant (Algebraic Number Theory : Recent Developments and Their Backgrounds)" (PDF). 数理解析研究所講究録 (Mathematical Analysis Workshop Proceedings) (844). Departmental Bulletin Paper, Kyoto University: 79–83.
- Saito, Takeshi (2004). "Log smooth extension of a family of curves and semi-stable reduction". Journal of Algebraic Geometry. 13 (2): 287–322. doi:10.1090/S1056-3911-03-00338-2.
- Saito, Takeshi (2014). "Characteristic cycle and the Euler number of a constructible sheaf on a surface". arXiv:1402.5720 [math.AG].

=== Books ===
- Kato, Kazuya; Kurokawa, Nobushige; Saito, Takeshi; Kurihara, Masato (2000). Number Theory 1: Fermat's Dream. Translations of Mathematical Monographs, vol. 186. American Mathematical Soc. ISBN 978-0-8218-0863-4.
- Kato, Kazuya; Kurokawa, Nobushige; Saitō, Takeshi; Kurihara, Masato (2000). Number Theory 2: Introduction to class field theory. Translations of Mathematical Monographs, vol. 240. American Mathematical Society. ISBN 978-0-8218-1355-3.
- Saito, Takeshi (2014-12-18). Fermat's Last Theorem: The Proof. Translations of Mathematical Monographs, vol. 245. American Mathematical Society. ISBN 978-0-8218-9849-9.
