= Tate twist =

Mathematical operation on Galois modules

In number theory and algebraic geometry, the Tate twist, named after John Tate, is an operation on Galois modules.

For example, if K is a field, G_{K} is its absolute Galois group, and ρ : G_{K} → Aut_{Q_{p}}(V) is a representation of G_{K} on a finite-dimensional vector space V over the field Q_{p} of p-adic numbers, then the Tate twist of V, denoted V(1), is the representation on the tensor product V⊗Q_{p}(1), where Q_{p}(1) is the p-adic cyclotomic character (i.e. the Tate module of the group of roots of unity in the separable closure K^{s} of K). More generally, if m is a positive integer, the mth Tate twist of V, denoted V(m), is the tensor product of V with the m-fold tensor product of Q_{p}(1). Denoting by Q_{p}(−1) the dual representation of Q_{p}(1), the −mth Tate twist of V can be defined as

$$V\otimes\mathbf{Q}_p(-1)^{\otimes m}.$$
