= Kazuya Kato =

Japanese mathematician (born 1952)

- 加藤 和也
- Born: 17 January 1952 (age 74); Wakayama, Japan
- Education: University of Tokyo
- Scientific career
- Workplaces: University of Chicago
- Doctoral advisor: Yasutaka Ihara
- Doctoral students: Takeshi Saito

Kazuya Kato (加藤 和也, Katō Kazuya; born on January 17, 1952) is a Japanese mathematician who works at the University of Chicago, as a professor, and specializes in number theory and arithmetic geometry. He is a member of the American Academy of Arts and Sciences, elected in 2011. He received the 2005 Imperial Prize of the Japan Academy.

== Early life and education ==
Kazuya Kato grew up in the prefecture of Wakayama in Japan. He attended college at the University of Tokyo, from which he also obtained his master's degree in 1975, and a PhD in 1980.

== Career ==
Kato lectured, as a professor, at Tokyo University in 1982, then from 1997 to 2001. He also taught at Tokyo Institute of Technology in 1992. He later became a faculty member at the University of Chicago in 2009.

A special volume of Documenta Mathematica was published in honor of his 50th birthday, together with research papers written by leading number theorists and former students it contains Kato's song on Prime Numbers.

== Research and contributions ==
Kato has researched and contributed to various areas in number theory and geometry, some of which include: the "Galois theory of fields, Iwasawa theory, p-adic cohomology, L-functions, K-theory and Hodge theory." He started the use of logarithmic structure to redefine Hodge structure as well.

== Awards and honors ==
In 2005, Kato received the Imperial Prize of the Japan Academy for "Research on Arithmetic Geometry".

== Books ==
Kato has published several books in Japanese, of which some have already been translated into English.

He wrote a book on Fermat's Last Theorem and is also the coauthor of two volumes of the trilogy on Number Theory, which have been translated into English.
