= Cyclotomic character =

In number theory, a cyclotomic character is a character of a Galois group giving the Galois action on a group of roots of unity. As a one-dimensional representation over a ring R, its representation space is generally denoted by R(1) (that is, it is a representation χ : G → Aut_{R}(R(1)) ≈ GL(1, R)).

== p-adic cyclotomic character ==
Fix p a prime, and let $G_\mathbf{Q}$ denote the absolute Galois group of the rational numbers. The roots of unity
$$\mu_{p^n} = \left\{ \zeta \in \bar\mathbf{Q}^\times \mid \zeta^{p^n} = 1 \right\}$$
form a cyclic group of order $p^n$, generated by any choice of a primitive p^{n}th root of unity ζ_{p^{n}}.

Since all of the primitive roots in $\mu_{p^n}$ are Galois conjugate, the Galois group $G_\mathbf{Q}$ acts on $\mu_{p^n}$ by automorphisms. After fixing a primitive root of unity $\zeta_{p^n}$ generating $\mu_{p^n}$, any element $\zeta\in\mu_{p^n}$ can be written as a power of $\zeta_{p^n}$, where the exponent is a unique element in $\mathbf{Z}/p^n\mathbf{Z}$, which is a unit if $\zeta$ is also primitive. One can thus write, for $\sigma\in G_\mathbf{Q}$,

$$\sigma.\zeta := \sigma(\zeta) = \zeta^{a(\sigma, n)}$$

with $a(\sigma,n) \in (\mathbf{Z}/p^n \mathbf{Z})^\times$ independent of $\zeta$, but depending on both $\sigma$ and $p$. This defines a group homomorphism called the mod p^{n} cyclotomic character:

$$\begin{align}{\chi_{p^n}}:G_{\mathbf{Q}} &\to (\mathbf{Z}/p^n\mathbf{Z})^{\times} \\ \sigma &\mapsto a(\sigma, n), \end{align}$$
which is viewed as a character since the action corresponds to a homomorphism $G_{\mathbf Q} \to \mathrm{Aut}(\mu_{p^n}) \cong (\mathbf{Z}/p^n\mathbf{Z})^\times \cong \mathrm{GL}_1(\mathbf{Z}/p^n\mathbf{Z})$.

Fixing $p$ and $\sigma$ and varying $n$, the $a(\sigma, n)$ form a compatible system in the sense that they give an element of the inverse limit
$$\varprojlim_n
(\mathbf{Z}/p^n\mathbf{Z})^\times \cong \mathbf{Z}_p^\times,$$
the units in the ring of p-adic integers. Thus the ${\chi_{p^n}}$ assemble to a group homomorphism called p-adic cyclotomic character:

$$\begin{align} \chi_p:G_{\mathbf Q} &\to \mathbf{Z}_p^\times \cong \mathrm{GL_1}(\mathbf{Z}_p) \\ \sigma &\mapsto (a(\sigma, n))_n \end{align}$$
encoding the action of $G_{\mathbf Q}$ on all p-power roots of unity $\mu_{p^n}$ simultaneously. In fact equipping $G_{\mathbf Q}$ with the Krull topology and $\mathbf{Z}_p$ with the p-adic topology makes this a continuous representation of a topological group.

== As a compatible system of ℓ-adic representations ==
By varying ℓ over all prime numbers, a compatible system of ℓ-adic representations is obtained from the ℓ-adic cyclotomic characters (when considering compatible systems of representations, the standard terminology is to use the symbol ℓ to denote a prime instead of p). That is to say, χ = { χ_{ℓ} }_{ℓ} is a "family" of ℓ-adic representations

$$\chi_\ell:G_\mathbf{Q}\rightarrow\operatorname{GL}_1(\mathbf{Z}_\ell)$$

satisfying certain compatibilities between different primes. In fact, the χ_{ℓ} form a strictly compatible system of ℓ-adic representations.

== Geometric realizations ==
The p-adic cyclotomic character is the p-adic Tate module of the multiplicative group scheme G_{m,Q} over Q. As such, its representation space can be viewed as the inverse limit of the groups of p^{n}th roots of unity in Q̅.

In terms of cohomology, the p-adic cyclotomic character is the dual of the first p-adic étale cohomology group of G_{m}. It can also be found in the étale cohomology of a projective variety, namely the projective line: it is the dual of H^{2}_{ét}(P^{1} ).

In terms of motives, the p-adic cyclotomic character is the p-adic realization of the Tate motive Z(1). As a Grothendieck motive, the Tate motive is the dual of H^{2}( P^{1} ).

== Properties ==
The p-adic cyclotomic character satisfies several nice properties.

- It is unramified at all primes ℓ ≠ p (i.e. the inertia subgroup at ℓ acts trivially).
- If Frob_{ℓ} is a Frobenius element for ℓ ≠ p, then χ_{p}(Frob_{ℓ}) = ℓ.
- It is crystalline at p.

== See also ==
- Tate twist
