= Tate module =

Algebraic structure

In mathematics, a Tate module of an abelian group, named for John Tate, is a module constructed from an abelian group A. Often, this construction is made in the following situation: G is a commutative group scheme over a field K, K^{s} is the separable closure of K, and A = G(K^{s}) (the K^{s}-valued points of G). In this case, the Tate module of A is equipped with an action of the absolute Galois group of K, and it is referred to as the Tate module of G.

== Definition ==
Given an abelian group A and a prime number p, the p-adic Tate module of A is

$$T_p(A)=\underset{\longleftarrow}{\lim} A[p^n]$$

where A[p^{n}] is the p^{n} torsion of A (i.e. the kernel of the multiplication-by-p^{n} map), and the inverse limit is over positive integers n with transition morphisms given by the multiplication-by-p map A[p^{n+1}] → A[p^{n}]. Thus, the Tate module encodes all the p-power torsion of A. It is equipped with the structure of a Z_{p}-module via

$$z(a_n)_n=((z\text{ mod }p^n)a_n)_n.$$

== Examples ==
=== The Tate module ===
When the abelian group A is the group of roots of unity in a separable closure K^{s} of K, the p-adic Tate module of A is sometimes referred to as the Tate module (where the choice of p and K are tacitly understood). It is a free rank one module over Z_{p} with a linear action of the absolute Galois group G_{K} of K. Thus, it is a Galois representation also referred to as the p-adic cyclotomic character of K. It can also be considered as the Tate module of the multiplicative group scheme G_{m,K} over K.

=== The Tate module of an abelian variety ===
Given an abelian variety G over a field K, the K^{s}-valued points of G are an abelian group. The p-adic Tate module T_{p}(G) of G is a Galois representation (of the absolute Galois group, G_{K}, of K).

Classical results on abelian varieties show that if K has characteristic zero, or characteristic ℓ where the prime number p ≠ ℓ, then T_{p}(G) is a free module over Z_{p} of rank 2d, where d is the dimension of G. In the other case, it is still free, but the rank may take any value from 0 to d (see for example Hasse–Witt matrix).

In the case where p is not equal to the characteristic of K, the p-adic Tate module of G is the dual of the étale cohomology $H^1_{\text{et}}(G\times_KK^s,\mathbf{Z}_p)$.

A special case of the Tate conjecture can be phrased in terms of Tate modules. Suppose K is finitely generated over its prime field (e.g. a finite field, an algebraic number field, a global function field), of characteristic different from p, and A and B are two abelian varieties over K. The Tate conjecture then predicts that

$$\mathrm{Hom}_K(A,B)\otimes\mathbf{Z}_p\cong\mathrm{Hom}_{G_K}(T_p(A),T_p(B))$$

where Hom_{K}(A, B) is the group of morphisms of abelian varieties from A to B, and the right-hand side is the group of G_{K}-linear maps from T_{p}(A) to T_{p}(B). The case where K is a finite field was proved by Tate himself in the 1960s. Gerd Faltings proved the case where K is a number field in his celebrated "Mordell paper".

In the case of a Jacobian over a curve C over a finite field k of characteristic prime to p, the Tate module can be identified with the Galois group of the composite extension

$$k(C) \subset \hat k (C) \subset A^{(p)} \$$

where $\hat k$ is an extension of k containing all p-power roots of unity and A^{(p)} is the maximal unramified abelian p-extension of $\hat k (C)$.

== Tate module of a number field ==
The description of the Tate module for the function field of a curve over a finite field suggests a definition for a Tate module of an algebraic number field, the other class of global field, introduced by Kenkichi Iwasawa. For a number field K we let K_{m} denote the extension by p^{m}-power roots of unity, $\hat K$ the union of the K_{m} and A^{(p)} the maximal unramified abelian p-extension of $\hat K$. Let

$$T_p(K) = \mathrm{Gal}(A^{(p)}/\hat K) \ .$$

Then T_{p}(K) is a pro-p-group and so a Z_{p}-module. Using class field theory one can describe T_{p}(K) as isomorphic to the inverse limit of the class groups C_{m} of the K_{m} under norm.

Iwasawa exhibited T_{p}(K) as a module over the completion Z_{p}[[T]] and this implies a formula for the exponent of p in the order of the class groups C_{m} of the form

$$\lambda m + \mu p^m + \kappa \ .$$

The Ferrero–Washington theorem states that μ is zero.

== See also ==
- Tate conjecture
- Tate twist
- Iwasawa theory
