= Barsotti–Tate group =

In algebraic geometry, Barsotti–Tate groups or p-divisible groups are similar to the points of order a power of p on an abelian variety in characteristic p. They were introduced by Barsotti (1962) under the name equidimensional hyperdomain and by Tate (1967) under the name p-divisible groups, and named Barsotti–Tate groups by Grothendieck (1971).

== Definition ==
Tate (1967) defined a p-divisible group of height h (over a scheme S) to be an inductive system of groups G_{n} for n≥0, such that G_{n} is a finite group scheme over S of order p^{hn} and such that G_{n} is (identified with) the group of elements of order divisible by p^{n} in G_{n+1}.

More generally, Grothendieck (1971) defined a Barsotti–Tate group G over a scheme S to be an fppf sheaf of commutative groups over S that is p-divisible, p-torsion, such that the points G(1) of order p of G are (represented by) a finite locally free scheme. The group G(1) has rank p^{h} for some locally constant function h on S, called the rank or height of the group G. The subgroup G(n) of points of order p^{n} is a scheme of rank p^{nh}, and G is the direct limit of these subgroups.

== Example ==
- Take G_{n} to be the cyclic group of order p^{n} (or rather the group scheme corresponding to it). This is a p-divisible group of height 1.
- Take G_{n} to be the group scheme of p^{n}th roots of 1. This is a p-divisible group of height 1.
- Take G_{n} to be the subgroup scheme of elements of order p^{n} of an abelian variety. This is a p-divisible group of height 2d where d is the dimension of the Abelian variety.
