= Arboreal Galois representation =

Mathematical arithmetic dynamics function

In arithmetic dynamics, an arboreal Galois representation is a continuous group homomorphism between the absolute Galois group of a field and the automorphism group of an infinite, regular, rooted tree.

The study of arboreal Galois representations of goes back to the works of Odoni in 1980s.

== Definition ==
Let $K$ be a field and $K^{sep}$ be its separable closure. The Galois group $G_K$ of the extension $K^{sep}/K$ is called the absolute Galois group of $K$. This is a profinite group and it is therefore endowed with its natural Krull topology.

For a positive integer $d$, let $T^d$ be the infinite regular rooted tree of degree $d$. This is an infinite tree where one node is labeled as the root of the tree and every node has exactly $d$ descendants. An automorphism of $T^d$ is a bijection of the set of nodes that preserves vertex-edge connectivity. The group $Aut(T^d)$ of all automorphisms of $T^d$ is a profinite group as well, as it can be seen as the inverse limit of the automorphism groups of the finite sub-trees $T^d_n$ formed by all nodes at distance at most $n$ from the root. The group of automorphisms of $T^d_n$ is isomorphic to $S_d\wr S_d\wr \ldots \wr S_d$, the iterated wreath product of $n$ copies of the symmetric group of degree $d$.

An arboreal Galois representation is a continuous group homomorphism $G_K \to Aut(T^d)$.

== Arboreal Galois representations attached to rational functions ==
The most natural source of arboreal Galois representations is the theory of iterations of self-rational functions on the projective line. Let $K$ be a field and $f \colon \mathbb P^1_K\to \mathbb P^1_K$ a rational function of degree $d$. For every $n\geq 1$ let $f^n=f\circ f\circ \ldots \circ f$ be the $n$-fold composition of the map $f$ with itself. Let $\alpha\in K$ and suppose that for every $n\geq 1$ the set $(f^n)^{-1}(\alpha)$ contains $d^n$ elements of the algebraic closure $\overline{K}$. Then one can construct an infinite, regular, rooted $d$-ary tree $T(f)$ in the following way: the root of the tree is $\alpha$, and the nodes at distance $n$ from $\alpha$ are the elements of $(f^n)^{-1}(\alpha)$. A node $\beta$ at distance $n$ from $\alpha$ is connected with an edge to a node $\gamma$ at distance $n+1$ from $\alpha$ if and only if $f(\beta)=\gamma$.

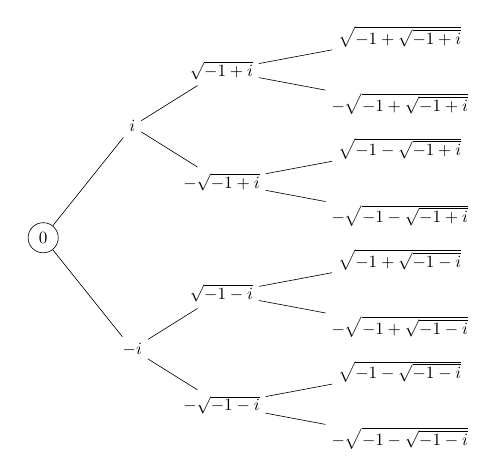
The first three levels of the tree of preimages of $0$ under the map $x^2+1$

The absolute Galois group $G_K$ acts on $T(f)$ via automorphisms, and the induced homomorphism $\rho_{f,\alpha}\colon G_K\to Aut(T(f))$ is continuous, and therefore is called the arboreal Galois representation attached to $f$ with basepoint $\alpha$.

Arboreal representations attached to rational functions can be seen as a wide generalization of Galois representations on Tate modules of abelian varieties.

== Arboreal Galois representations attached to quadratic polynomials ==
The simplest non-trivial case is that of monic quadratic polynomials. Let $K$ be a field of characteristic not 2, let $f=(x-a)^2+b\in K[x]$ and set the basepoint $\alpha=0$. The adjusted post-critical orbit of $f$ is the sequence defined by $c_1=-f(a)$ and $c_n= f^n(a)$ for every $n\geq 2$. A resultant argument shows that $(f^n)^{-1}(0)$ has $d^n$ elements for ever $n$ if and only if $c_n\neq 0$ for every $n$. In 1992, Stoll proved the following theorem:

Theorem: the arboreal representation $\rho_{f,0}$ is surjective if and only if the span of $\{c_1,\ldots,c_n\}$ in the $\mathbb F_2$-vector space $K^*/(K^*)^2$ is $n$-dimensional for every $n\geq 1$.

The following are examples of polynomials that satisfy the conditions of Stoll's Theorem, and that therefore have surjective arboreal representations.

- For $K=\mathbb Q$, $f=x^2+a$, where $a\in \mathbb Z$ is such that either $a>0$ and $a\equiv 1,2\bmod 4$ or $a<0$, $a\equiv 0\bmod 4$ and $-a$ is not a square.
- Let $k$ be a field of characteristic not $2$ and $K=k(t)$ be the rational function field over $k$. Then $f=x^2+t\in K[x]$ has surjective arboreal representation.

== Higher degrees and Odoni's conjecture ==
In 1985 Odoni formulated the following conjecture.

Conjecture: Let $K$ be a Hilbertian field of characteristic $0$, and let $n$ be a positive integer. Then there exists a polynomial $f\in K[x]$ of degree $n$ such that $\rho_{f,0}$ is surjective.

Although in this very general form the conjecture has been shown to be false by Dittmann and Kadets, there are several results when $K$ is a number field. Benedetto and Juul proved Odoni's conjecture for $K$ a number field and $n$ even, and also when both $[K:\mathbb Q]$ and $n$ are odd, Looper independently proved Odoni's conjecture for $n$ prime and $K=\mathbb Q$.

== Finite index conjecture ==
When $K$ is a global field and $f\in K(x)$ is a rational function of degree 2, the image of $\rho_{f,0}$ is expected to be "large" in most cases. The following conjecture quantifies the previous statement, and it was formulated by Jones in 2013.

Conjecture Let $K$ be a global field and $f\in K(x)$ a rational function of degree 2. Let $\gamma_1,\gamma_2\in \mathbb P^1_K$ be the critical points of $f$. Then $[Aut(T(f)):Im(\rho_{f,0})]=\infty$ if and only if at least one of the following conditions hold:

1. The map $f$ is post-critically finite, namely the orbits of $\gamma_1,\gamma_2$ are both finite.
2. There exists $n\geq 1$ such that $f^n(\gamma_1)=f^n(\gamma_2)$.
3. $0$ is a periodic point for $f$.
4. There exist a Möbius transformation $m=\frac{ax+b}{cx+d}\in PGL_2(K)$ that fixes $0$ and is such that $m\circ f \circ m^{-1}=f$.

Jones' conjecture is considered to be a dynamical analogue of Serre's open image theorem.

One direction of Jones' conjecture is known to be true: if $f$ satisfies one of the above conditions, then $[Aut(T(f)):Im(\rho_{f,0})]=\infty$. In particular, when $f$ is post-critically finite then $Im(\rho_{f,\alpha})$ is a topologically finitely generated closed subgroup of $Aut(T(f))$ for every $\alpha\in K$.

In the other direction, Juul et al. proved that if the abc conjecture holds for number fields, $K$ is a number field and $f\in K[x]$ is a quadratic polynomial, then $[Aut(T(f)):Im(\rho_{f,0})]=\infty$ if and only if $f$ is post-critically finite or not eventually stable. When $f\in K[x]$ is a quadratic polynomial, conditions (2) and (4) in Jones' conjecture are never satisfied. Moreover, Jones and Levy conjectured that $f$ is eventually stable if and only if $0$ is not periodic for $f$.

== Abelian arboreal representations ==
In 2020, Andrews and Petsche formulated the following conjecture.

Conjecture Let $K$ be a number field, let $f \in K[x]$ be a polynomial of degree $d\ge 2$ and let $\alpha\in K$. Then $Im(\rho_{f,\alpha})$ is abelian if and only if there exists a root of unity $\zeta$ such that the pair $(f,\alpha)$ is conjugate over the maximal abelian extension $K^{ab}$ to $(x^d,\zeta)$ or to $(\pm T_d,\zeta+\zeta^{-1})$, where $T_d$ is the Chebyshev polynomial of the first kind of degree $d$.

Two pairs $(f,\alpha),(g,\beta)$, where $f,g\in K(x)$ and $\alpha,\beta\in K$ are conjugate over a field extension $L/K$ if there exists a Möbius transformation $m=\frac{ax+b}{cx+d}\in PGL_2(L)$ such that $m\circ f \circ m^{-1}=g$ and $m(\alpha)=\beta$. Conjugacy is an equivalence relation. The Chebyshev polynomials the conjecture refers to are a normalized version, conjugate by the Möbius transformation $2x$ to make them monic.

It has been proven that Andrews and Petsche's conjecture holds true when $K=\mathbb Q$.
