= Shafarevich conjecture =

In mathematics, the Shafarevich conjecture, named for Igor Shafarevich, may refer to:

- The Tate–Shafarevich conjecture that the Tate–Shafarevich group is finite
- The Shafarevich conjecture that there are only finitely many isomorphism classes of abelian varieties of fixed dimension and fixed polarization degree over a fixed number field with good reduction outside a given finite set of places, now proved as Faltings' theorem
- The conjecture that the absolute Galois group of the maximal abelian extension of the rational numbers is a free profinite group of countable rank
