= Complete algebraic curve =

In algebraic geometry, a complete algebraic curve is an algebraic curve that is complete as an algebraic variety.

A projective curve, a dimension-one projective variety, is a complete curve. A complete curve (over an algebraically closed field) is projective. Because of this, over an algebraically closed field, the terms "projective curve" and "complete curve" are usually used interchangeably. Over a more general base scheme, the distinction still matters.

A curve in $\mathbb{P}^3$ is called an (algebraic) space curve, while a curve in $\mathbb{P}^2$ is called a plane curve. By means of a projection from a point, any smooth projective curve can be embedded into $\mathbb{P}^3$; thus, up to a projection, every (smooth) curve is a space curve. Up to a birational morphism, every (smooth) curve can be embedded into $\mathbb{P}^2$ as a nodal curve.

Riemann's existence theorem says that the category of compact Riemann surfaces is equivalent to that of smooth projective curves over the complex numbers.

Throughout the article, a curve mean a complete curve (but not necessarily smooth).

== Abstract complete curve ==
Let k be an algebrically closed field. By a function field K over k, we mean a finitely generated field extension of k that is typically not algebraic (i.e., a transcendental extension). The function field of an algebraic variety is a basic example. For a function field of transcendence degree one, the converse holds by the following construction. Let $C_K$ denote the set of all discrete valuation rings of $K/k$. We put the topology on $C_K$ so that the closed subsets are either finite subsets or the whole space. We then make it a locally ringed space by taking $\mathcal{O}(U)$ to be the intersection $\cap_{R \in U} R$. Then the $C_K$ for various function fields K of transcendence degree one form a category that is equivalent to the category of smooth projective curves.

One consequence of the above construction is that a complete smooth curve is projective (since a complete smooth curve of C corresponds to $C_K, K = k(C)$, which corresponds to a projective smooth curve.)

== Smooth completion of an affine curve ==
Let $C_0 = V(f) \subset \mathbb{A}^2$ be a smooth affine curve given by a polynomial f in two variables. The closure $\overline{C_0}$ in $\mathbb{P}^2$, the projective completion of it, may or may not be smooth. The normalization C of $\overline{C_0}$ is smooth and contains $C_0$ as an open dense subset. Then the curve $C$ is called the smooth completion of $C_0$. (Note the smooth completion of $C_0$ is unique up to isomorphism since two smooth curves are isomorphic if they are birational to each other.)

For example, if $f = y^2 - x^3 + 1$, then $\overline{C_0}$ is given by $y^2 z = x^3 - z^3$, which is smooth (by a Jacobian computation). On the other hand, consider $f = y^2 - x^6 + 1$. Then, by a Jacobian computation, $\overline{C_0}$ is not smooth. In fact, $C_0$ is an (affine) hyperelliptic curve and a hyperelliptic curve is not a plane curve (since a hyperelliptic curve is never a complete intersection in a projective space).

Over the complex numbers, C is a compact Riemann surface that is classically called the Riemann surface associated to the algebraic function $y(x)$ when $f(x, y(x)) \equiv 0$. Conversely, each compact Riemann surface is of that form; this is known as the Riemann existence theorem.

== A map from a curve to a projective space ==
To give a rational map from a (projective) curve C to a projective space is to give a linear system of divisors V on C, up to the fixed part of the system? (need to be clarified); namely, when B is the base locus (the common zero sets of the nonzero sections in V), there is:

$$f: C - B \to \mathbb{P}(V^*)$$

that maps each point $P$ in $C - B$ to the hyperplane $\{ s \in V | s(P) = 0 \}$. Conversely, given a rational map f from C to a projective space,

In particular, one can take the linear system to be the canonical linear system $|K| = \mathbb{P}(\Gamma(C, \omega_C))$ and the corresponding map is called the canonical map.

Let $g$ be the genus of a smooth curve C. If $g = 0$, then $|K|$ is empty while if $g = 1$, then $|K| = 0$. If $g \ge 2$, then the canonical linear system $|K|$ can be shown to have no base point and thus determines the morphism $f : C \to \mathbb{P}^{g-1}$. If the degree of f or equivalently the degree of the linear system is 2, then C is called a hyperelliptic curve.

Max Noether's theorem implies that a non-hyperelliptic curve is projectively normal when it is embedded into a projective space by the canonical divisor.

== Classification of smooth algebraic curves in $\mathbb{P}^3$ ==
The classification of a smooth projective curve begins with specifying a genus. For genus zero, there is only one: the projective line $\mathbb{P}^1$ (up to isomorphism). A genus-one curve is precisely an elliptic curve and isomorphism classes of elliptic curves are specified by a j-invariant (which is an element of the base field). The classification of genus-2 curves is much more complicated; here is some partial result over an algebraically closed field of characteristic not two:

- Each genus-two curve X comes with the map $f: X \to \mathbb{P}^1$ determined by the canonical divisor; called the canonical map. The canonical map has exactly 6 ramified points of index 2.
- Conversely, given distinct 6 points $a_1, \dots, a_6$, let $K$ be the field extension of $k(x)$, x a variable, given by the equation $y^2 = (x-a_1) \cdots (x-a_6)$ and $f : X \to \mathbb{P}^1$ the map corresponding to the extension. Then $X$ is a genus-two curve and $f$ ramifies exactly over those six points.

For genus $\ge 3$, the following terminology is used:

- Given a smooth curve C, a divisor D on it and a vector subspace $V \subset H^0(C, \mathcal{O}(D))$, one says the linear system $\mathbb{P}(V)$ is a g^{r}_{d} if V has dimension r+1 and D has degree d. One says C has a g^{r}_{d} if there is such a linear system.

== Fundamental group ==
Let X be a smooth complete algebraic curve. Then the étale fundamental group of X is defined as:

$$\pi_1(X) = \varprojlim_{L/K} \operatorname{Gal}(L/K)$$

where $K$ is the function field of X and $L/K$ is a Galois extension.

== Specific curves ==
=== Canonical curve ===
If X is a nonhyperelliptic curve of genus $\ge 3$, then the linear system $|K|$ associated to the canonical divisor is very ample; i.e., it gives an embedding into the projective space. The image of that embedding is then called a canonical curve.

=== Stable curve ===
For genus $g \ge 2$, a stable curve is a connected nodal curve with finite automorphism group.

== Vector bundles on a curve ==
=== Line bundles and dual graph ===
Let X be a possibly singular curve over complex numbers. Then

$$0 \to \mathbb{C}^* \to (\mathbb{C}^*)^r \to \Gamma(X, \mathcal{F}) \to \operatorname{Pic}(X) \to \operatorname{Pic}(\widetilde{X}) \to 0.$$

where r is the number of irreducible components of X, $\pi:\widetilde{X} \to X$ is the normalization and $\mathcal{F} = \pi_* \mathcal{O}_{\widetilde{X}}/\mathcal{O}_X$. (To get this use the fact $\operatorname{Pic}(X) = \operatorname{H}^1(X, \mathcal{O}_X^*)$ and $\operatorname{Pic}(\widetilde{X}) = \operatorname{H}^1(\widetilde{X}, \mathcal{O}_{\widetilde{X}}^*) = \operatorname{H}^1(X, \pi_* \mathcal{O}_{\widetilde{X}}^*).$)

Taking the long exact sequence of the exponential sheaf sequence gives the degree map:

$$\deg: \operatorname{Pic}(X) \to \operatorname{H}^2(X; \mathbb{Z}) \simeq \mathbb{Z}^r.$$

By definition, the Jacobian variety J(X) of X is the identity component of the kernel of this map. Then the previous exact sequence gives:

$$0 \to \mathbb{C}^* \to (\mathbb{C}^*)^r \to \Gamma(\widetilde{X}, \mathcal{F}) \to J(X) \to J(\widetilde{X}) \to 0.$$

We next define the dual graph of X; a one-dimensional CW complex defined as follows. (related to whether a curve is of compact type or not)

=== The Jacobian of a curve ===
Let C be a smooth connected curve. Given an integer d, let $\operatorname{Pic}^d C$ denote the set of isomorphism classes of line bundles on C of degree d. It can be shown to have a structure of an algebraic variety.

For each integer d > 0, let $C^d, C_d$ denote respectively the d-th fold Cartesian and symmetric product of C; by definition, $C_d$ is the quotient of $C^d$ by the symmetric group permuting the factors.

Fix a base point $p_0$ of C. Then there is the map

$$u: C_d \to J(C).$$

=== Stable bundles on a curve ===
The Jacobian of a curve can be generalized to higher-rank vector bundles; a key notion introduced by Mumford that allows for a moduli construction is that of stability.

Let C be a connected smooth curve. A rank-2 vector bundle E on C is said to be stable if for every line subbundle L of E,

$$\operatorname{deg} L < {1 \over 2} \operatorname{deg} E$$.

Given some line bundle L on C, let $SU_C(2, L)$ denote the set of isomorphism classes of rank-2 stable bundles E on C whose determinants are isomorphic to L.

== The osculating behavior of a curve ==
=== Vanishing sequence ===
Given a linear series V on a curve X, the image of it under $\operatorname{ord}_p$ is a finite set and following the tradition we write it as

$$a_0(V, p) < a_1(V, p) < \cdots < a_r(V, p).$$

This sequence is called the vanishing sequence. For example, $a_0(V, p)$ is the multiplicity of a base point p. We think of higher $a_i(V, p)$ as encoding information about inflection of the Kodaira map $\varphi_V$. The ramification sequence is then

$$b_i(V, p) = a_i(V, p) - i.$$

Their sum is called the ramification index of p. The global ramification is given by the following formula:

Plücker formula—

$$\sum_{p \in X} \sum_0^r b_i(V, p) = (r+1)(d + r(g-1)).$$

== Uniformization ==
An elliptic curve X over the complex numbers has a uniformization $\mathbb{C} \to X$ given by taking the quotient by a lattice.

== Relative curve ==
A relative curve or a curve over a scheme S or a relative curve is a flat morphism of schemes $X \to S$ such that each geometric fiber is an algebraic curve; in other words, it is a family of curves parametrized by the base scheme S.

See also Semistable reduction theorem.

=== The Mumford–Tate uniformization ===
This generalizes the classical construction due to Tate (cf. Tate curve). Given a smooth projective curve of genus at least two and has a split degeneration.

== See also ==
- Severi variety (Hilbert scheme)
- Hurwitz scheme
