= Grothendieck's Galois theory =

Abstract approach to algebraic geometry

In mathematics, Grothendieck's Galois theory is an abstract approach to the Galois theory of fields, developed around 1960 to provide a way to study the fundamental group of algebraic topology in the setting of algebraic geometry. It provides, in the classical setting of field theory, an alternative perspective to that of Emil Artin based on linear algebra, which became standard from about the 1930s.

The approach of Alexander Grothendieck is concerned with the category-theoretic properties that characterise the categories of finite G-sets for a fixed profinite group G. For example, G might be the group denoted $\hat{\Z}$ (see profinite integer), which is the inverse limit of the cyclic additive groups $\Z/n\Z$ — or equivalently the completion of the infinite cyclic group $\Z$ for the topology of subgroups of finite index. A finite G-set is then a finite set X on which G acts through a quotient finite cyclic group, so that it is specified by giving some permutation of X.

In the above example, a connection with classical Galois theory can be seen by regarding $\hat{\Z}$ as the profinite Galois group Gal(F̅/F) of the algebraic closure F̅ of any finite field F, over F. That is, the automorphisms of F̅ fixing F are described by the inverse limit, as we take larger and larger finite splitting fields over F. The connection with geometry can be seen when we look at covering spaces of the unit disk in the complex plane with the origin removed: the finite covering realised by the z^{n} map of the disk, thought of by means of a complex number variable z, corresponds to the subgroup $n \Z$ of the fundamental group of the punctured disk.

The theory of Grothendieck, published in SGA1, shows how to reconstruct the category of G-sets from a fibre functor $\Phi$, which in the geometric setting takes the fibre of a covering above a fixed base point (as a set). In fact there is an isomorphism proved of the type

$$G \cong \operatorname{Aut}(\Phi)$$,

the latter being the group of automorphisms (self-natural equivalences) of $\Phi$. An abstract classification of categories with a functor to the category of sets is given, by means of which one can recognise categories of G-sets for G profinite.

To see how this applies to the case of fields, one has to study the tensor product of fields. In topos theory this is a part of the study of atomic toposes.

== See also ==
- Tannakian formalism
- Fiber functor
- Anabelian geometry
