= Profinite =

In mathematics, the term profinite is used for

- profinite groups, topological groups
- profinite sets, also known as "profinite spaces" or "Stone spaces"
- profinite integers
