= Esquisse d'un Programme =

1984 research proposal by A. Grothendieck

"Esquisse d'un Programme" (Sketch of a Programme) is a famous proposal for long-term mathematical research made by the German-born, French mathematician Alexander Grothendieck in 1984. He pursued the sequence of logically linked ideas in his important project proposal from 1984 until 1988, but his proposed research continues to date to be of major interest in several branches of advanced mathematics. Grothendieck's vision provides inspiration today for several developments in mathematics such as the extension and generalization of Galois theory.

== Brief history ==
Submitted in 1984, the Esquisse d'un Programme was a proposal by Alexander Grothendieck for a position at the Centre National de la Recherche Scientifique. The proposal was not successful, but Grothendieck obtained a special position where, while keeping his affiliation at the University of Montpellier, he was paid by the CNRS and released of his teaching obligations. Grothendieck held this position from 1984 till 1988. This proposal was not formally published until 1997, because the author "could not be found, much less his permission requested". The outlines of dessins d'enfants, or "children's drawings", and "anabelian geometry", that are contained in this manuscript continue to inspire research; thus, "Anabelian geometry is a proposed theory in mathematics, describing the way the algebraic fundamental group G of an algebraic variety V, or some related geometric object, determines how V can be mapped into another geometric object W, under the assumption that G is not an abelian group, in the sense of being strongly noncommutative. The idea of anabelian (an alpha privative an- before abelian), first introduced in Letter to Faltings (June 27, 1983), is developed in Esquisse d'un Programme. While the work of Grothendieck was for many years unpublished, and unavailable through the traditional formal scholarly channels, the formulation and predictions of the proposed theory received much attention, and some alterations, at the hands of a number of mathematicians. Those who have researched in this area have obtained some expected and related results, and in the 21st century the beginnings of such a theory started to be available."

== Abstract of Grothendieck's programme ==
("Sommaire")

- 1. The Proposal and enterprise ("Envoi").
- 2. "Teichmüller's Lego-game and the Galois group of Q̅ over Q" ("Un jeu de “Lego-Teichmüller” et le groupe de Galois de Q̅ sur Q").
- 3. Number fields associated with dessins d'enfant". ("Corps de nombres associés à un dessin d’enfant").
- 4. Regular polyhedra over finite fields ("Polyèdres réguliers sur les corps finis").
- 5. General topology or a 'Moderated Topology' ("Haro sur la topologie dite 'générale', et réflexions heuristiques vers une topologie dite 'modérée").
- 6. Differentiable theories and moderated theories ("Théories différentiables" (à la Nash) et “théories modérées").
- 7. Pursuing Stacks ("À la Poursuite des Champs").
- 8. Two-dimensional geometry ("Digressions de géométrie bidimensionnelle").
- 9. Summary of proposed studies ("Bilan d’une activité enseignante").
- 10. Epilogue.
- Notes

Suggested further reading for the interested mathematical reader is provided in the References section.

=== Extensions of Galois's theory for groups: Galois groupoids, categories and functors ===
Galois developed a powerful, fundamental algebraic theory in mathematics that provides very efficient computations for certain algebraic problems by utilizing the algebraic concept of groups, which is now known as the theory of Galois groups; such computations were not possible before, and also in many cases are much more effective than the 'direct' calculations without using groups. To begin with, Alexander Grothendieck stated in his proposal: "Thus, the group of Galois is realized as the automorphism group of a concrete, pro-finite group which respects certain structures that are essential to this group." This fundamental, Galois group theory in mathematics has been considerably expanded, at first to groupoids—as proposed in Alexander Grothendieck's Esquisse d' un Programme (EdP)—and now already partially carried out for groupoids; the latter are now further developed beyond groupoids to categories by several groups of mathematicians. Here, we shall focus only on the well-established and fully validated extensions of Galois' theory. Thus, EdP also proposed and anticipated, along with Grothendieck's previous IHÉS seminars (SGA1 to SGA4) held in the 1960s, the development of even more powerful extensions of the original Galois's theory for groups by utilizing categories, functors and natural transformations, as well as further expansion of the manifold of ideas presented in Alexander Grothendieck's Descent Theory. The notion of motive has also been pursued actively. This was developed into the motivic Galois group, Grothendieck topology and Grothendieck category. Such developments were recently extended in algebraic topology via representable functors and the fundamental groupoid functor.

== See also ==
- Anabelian geometry
- Grothendieck's Galois theory
- Grothendieck's Séminaire de géométrie algébrique
- Stratified space
