= Grothendieck–Teichmüller group =

Mathematical group

In mathematics, the Grothendieck–Teichmüller group GT is a group closely related to (and possibly equal to) the absolute Galois group of the rational numbers. It was introduced by Vladimir Drinfeld (1990) and named after Alexander Grothendieck and Oswald Teichmüller, based on Grothendieck's suggestion in his 1984 essay Esquisse d'un Programme to study the absolute Galois group of the rationals by relating it to its action on the Teichmüller tower of Teichmüller groupoids T_{g,n}, the fundamental groupoids of moduli stacks of genus g curves with n points removed.

There are several variations of the group:

- a pro-l version, which is motivic
- a k-pro-unipotent version, and
- a profinite version, which is anabelian,;

These versions were jointly defined by V. Drinfeld and Y.Ihara.
