= Class field theory =

Branch of algebraic number theory concerned with abelian extensions

In mathematics, class field theory (CFT) is the fundamental branch of algebraic number theory whose goal is to describe all the abelian Galois extensions of local and global fields using objects associated to the ground field.

Hilbert is credited as one of pioneers of the notion of a class field. However, this notion was already familiar to Kronecker and it was actually Weber who coined the term before Hilbert's fundamental papers came out. The relevant ideas were developed in the period of several decades, giving rise to a set of conjectures by Hilbert that were subsequently proved by Takagi and Artin (with the help of Chebotarev's theorem).

One of the major results is: given a number field F, and writing K for the maximal abelian unramified extension of F, the Galois group of K over F is canonically isomorphic to the ideal class group of F. This statement was generalized to the so called Artin reciprocity law; in the idelic language, writing C_{F} for the idele class group of F, and taking L to be any finite abelian extension of F, this law gives a canonical isomorphism

$$\theta_{L/F}: C_F/{N_{L/F}(C_L)} \to \operatorname{Gal}(L/F),$$

where $N_{L/F}$ denotes the idelic norm map from L to F. This isomorphism is named the reciprocity map.

The existence theorem states that the reciprocity map can be used to give a bijection between the set of abelian extensions of F and the set of closed subgroups of finite index of $C_F.$

A standard method for developing global class field theory since the 1930s was to construct local class field theory, which describes abelian extensions of local fields, and then use it to construct global class field theory. This was first done by Artin and Tate using the theory of group cohomology, and in particular by developing the notion of class formations. Later, Neukirch found a proof of the main statements of global class field theory without using cohomological ideas. His method was explicit and algorithmic.

Inside class field theory one can distinguish special class field theory and general class field theory.

Explicit class field theory provides an explicit construction of maximal abelian extensions of a number field in various situations. This portion of the theory consists of Kronecker–Weber theorem, which can be used to construct the abelian extensions of $\Q$, and the theory of complex multiplication to construct abelian extensions of CM-fields.

There are three main generalizations of class field theory: higher class field theory, the Langlands program (or 'Langlands correspondences'), and anabelian geometry.

== Formulation in contemporary language ==
In modern mathematical language, class field theory (CFT) can be formulated as follows. Consider the maximal abelian extension A of a local or global field K. It is of infinite degree over K; the Galois group G of A over K is an infinite profinite group, so a compact topological group, and it is abelian. The central aims of class field theory are: to describe G in terms of certain appropriate topological objects associated to K, to describe finite abelian extensions of K in terms of open subgroups of finite index in the topological object associated to K. In particular, one wishes to establish a one-to-one correspondence between finite abelian extensions of K and their norm groups in this topological object for K. This topological object is the multiplicative group in the case of local fields with finite residue field and the idele class group in the case of global fields. The finite abelian extension corresponding to an open subgroup of finite index is called the class field for that subgroup, which gave the name to the theory.

The fundamental result of general class field theory states that the group G is naturally isomorphic to the profinite completion of C_{K}, the multiplicative group of a local field or the idele class group of the global field, with respect to the natural topology on C_{K} related to the specific structure of the field K. Equivalently, for any finite Galois extension L of K, there is an isomorphism (the Artin reciprocity map)

$$\operatorname{Gal}(L/K)^{\operatorname{ab}} \to C_K/N_{L/K} (C_L)$$

of the abelianization of the Galois group of the extension with the quotient of the idele class group of K by the image of the norm of the idele class group of L.

For some small fields, such as the field of rational numbers $\Q$ or its quadratic imaginary extensions there is a more detailed very explicit but too specific theory which provides more information. For example, the abelianized absolute Galois group G of $\Q$ is (naturally isomorphic to) an infinite product of the group of units of the p-adic integers taken over all prime numbers p, and the corresponding maximal abelian extension of the rationals is the field generated by all roots of unity. This is known as the Kronecker–Weber theorem, originally conjectured by Leopold Kronecker. In this case the reciprocity isomorphism of class field theory (or Artin reciprocity map) also admits an explicit description due to the Kronecker–Weber theorem. However, principal constructions of such more detailed theories for small algebraic number fields are not extendable to the general case of algebraic number fields, and different conceptual principles are in use in the general class field theory.

The standard method to construct the reciprocity homomorphism is to first construct the local reciprocity isomorphism from the multiplicative group of the completion of a global field to the Galois group of its maximal abelian extension (this is done inside local class field theory) and then prove that the product of all such local reciprocity maps when defined on the idele group of the global field is trivial on the image of the multiplicative group of the global field. The latter property is called the global reciprocity law and is a far reaching generalization of the Gauss quadratic reciprocity law.

One of the methods to construct the reciprocity homomorphism uses class formation which derives class field theory from axioms of class field theory. This derivation is purely topological group theoretical, while to establish the axioms one has to use the ring structure of the ground field.

There are methods which use cohomology groups, in particular the Brauer group, and there are methods which do not use cohomology groups and are very explicit and fruitful for applications.

== History ==
The origins of class field theory lie in the quadratic reciprocity law proved by Gauss. The generalization took place as a long-term historical project, involving quadratic forms and their 'genus theory', work of Ernst Kummer and Leopold Kronecker/Kurt Hensel on ideals and completions, the theory of cyclotomic and Kummer extensions.

The first two class field theories were very explicit cyclotomic and complex multiplication class field theories. They used additional structures: in the case of the field of rational numbers they use roots of unity, in the case of imaginary quadratic extensions of the field of rational numbers they use elliptic curves with complex multiplication and their points of finite order. Much later, the theory of Shimura provided another very explicit class field theory for a class of algebraic number fields. In positive characteristic $p$, Kawada and Satake used Witt duality to get a very easy description of the $p$-part of the reciprocity homomorphism.

However, these very explicit theories could not be extended to more general number fields. General class field theory used different concepts and constructions which work over every global field.

The famous problems of David Hilbert stimulated further development, which led to the reciprocity laws, and proofs by Teiji Takagi, Philipp Furtwängler, Emil Artin, Helmut Hasse and many others. The crucial Takagi existence theorem was known by 1920 and all the main results by about 1930. One of the last classical conjectures to be proved was the principalisation property. The first proofs of class field theory used substantial analytic methods. In the 1930s and subsequently saw the increasing use of infinite extensions and Wolfgang Krull's theory of their Galois groups. This combined with Pontryagin duality to give a clearer if more abstract formulation of the central result, the Artin reciprocity law. An important step was the introduction of ideles by Claude Chevalley in the 1930s to replace ideal classes, essentially clarifying and simplifying the description of abelian extensions of global fields. Most of the central results were proved by 1940.

Later the results were reformulated in terms of group cohomology, which became a standard way to learn class field theory for several generations of number theorists. One drawback of the cohomological method is its relative inexplicitness. As the result of local contributions by Bernard Dwork, John Tate, Michiel Hazewinkel and a local and global reinterpretation by Jürgen Neukirch and also in relation to the work on explicit reciprocity formulas by many mathematicians, a very explicit and cohomology-free presentation of class field theory was established in the 1990s. (See, for example, Class Field Theory by Neukirch.)

== Applications ==
Class field theory is used to prove Artin-Verdier duality. Very explicit class field theory is used in many subareas of algebraic number theory such as Iwasawa theory and Galois modules theory.

Most main achievements toward the Langlands correspondence for number fields, the BSD conjecture for number fields, and Iwasawa theory for number fields use very explicit but narrow class field theory methods or their generalizations. The open question is therefore to use generalizations of general class field theory in these three directions.

== Generalizations of class field theory ==
There are three main generalizations, each of great interest. They are: the Langlands program, anabelian geometry, and higher class field theory.

Often, the Langlands correspondence is viewed as a nonabelian class field theory. If or when it is fully established, it would contain a certain theory of nonabelian Galois extensions of global fields. However, the Langlands correspondence does not include as much arithmetical information about finite Galois extensions as class field theory does in the abelian case. It also does not include an analog of the existence theorem in class field theory: the concept of class fields is absent in the Langlands correspondence. There are several other nonabelian theories, local and global, which provide alternatives to the Langlands correspondence point of view.

Another generalization of class field theory is anabelian geometry, which studies algorithms to restore the original object (e.g. a number field or a hyperbolic curve over it) from the knowledge of its full absolute Galois group or algebraic fundamental group.

Another natural generalization is higher class field theory, divided into higher local class field theory and higher global class field theory. It describes abelian extensions of higher local fields and higher global fields. The latter come as function fields of schemes of finite type over integers and their appropriate localizations and completions. It uses algebraic K-theory, and appropriate Milnor K-groups generalize the $K_1$ used in one-dimensional class field theory.

== See also ==
- Frobenioid
