= Tannakian formalism =

Monoidal category

In mathematics, a Tannakian category is a particular kind of monoidal category C, equipped with some extra structure relative to a given field K. The role of such categories C is to generalise the category of linear representations of an algebraic group G defined over K. A number of major applications of the theory have been made, or might be made in pursuit of some of the central conjectures of contemporary algebraic geometry and number theory.

The name is taken from Tadao Tannaka and Tannaka–Krein duality, a theory about compact groups G and their representation theory. The theory was developed first in the school of Alexander Grothendieck. It was later reconsidered by Pierre Deligne, and some simplifications made. The pattern of the theory is that of Grothendieck's Galois theory, which is a theory about finite permutation representations of groups G which are profinite groups.

The gist of the theory is that the fiber functor Φ of the Galois theory is replaced by an exact and faithful tensor functor F from C to the category of finite-dimensional vector spaces over K. The group of natural transformations of Φ to itself, which turns out to be a profinite group in the Galois theory, is replaced by the group G of natural transformations of F into itself, that respect the tensor structure. This is in general not an algebraic group but a more general group scheme that is an inverse limit of algebraic groups (pro-algebraic group), and C is then found to be equivalent to the category of finite-dimensional linear representations of G.

More generally, it may be that fiber functors F as above only exists to categories of finite-dimensional vector spaces over non-trivial extension fields L/K. In such cases the group scheme G is replaced by a gerbe $\mathcal G$ on the fpqc site of Spec(K), and C is then equivalent to the category of (finite-dimensional) representations of $\mathcal G$.

== Formal definition of Tannakian categories ==
Let K be a field and C a K-linear abelian rigid tensor (i.e., a symmetric monoidal) category such that $\mathrm{End}(\mathbf{1})\cong K$. Then C is a Tannakian category (over K) if there is an extension field L of K such that there exists a K-linear exact and faithful tensor functor (i.e., a strong monoidal functor) F from C to the category of finite dimensional L-vector spaces. A Tannakian category over K is neutral if such exact faithful tensor functor F exists with L=K.

== Characterization by affine gerbes ==
For any gerbe $\mathcal G$ over $\operatorname{Aff}_K$ (for the fpqc topology), denote by $\operatorname{Rep}_K(\mathcal G)$ the category of cartesian functors $\mathcal G\to\mathrm{PROJ}$.

A Tannakian category over $K$ can be characterized intrinsically as a rigid abelian tensor category $\mathcal C$ with $\operatorname{End}(\mathbf 1)=K$ such that its associated gerbe of fiber functors $\operatorname{FIB}(\mathcal C)$ is an affine gerbe and the canonical functor

$$\mathcal C\longrightarrow\operatorname{Rep}_K(\operatorname{FIB}(\mathcal C))$$

is an equivalence of categories.

== Applications ==
The tannakian construction is used in relations between Hodge structure and l-adic representation. Morally, the philosophy of motives tells us that the Hodge structure and the Galois representation associated to an algebraic variety are related to each other. The closely related algebraic groups Mumford–Tate group and motivic Galois group arise from categories of Hodge structures, category of Galois representations and motives through Tannakian categories. Mumford-Tate conjecture proposes that the algebraic groups arising from the Hodge structure and the Galois representation by means of Tannakian categories are isomorphic to one another up to connected components.

Those areas of application are closely connected to the theory of motives. Another place in which Tannakian categories have been used is in connection with the Grothendieck–Katz p-curvature conjecture; in other words, in bounding monodromy groups.

The Geometric Satake equivalence establishes an equivalence between representations of the Langlands dual group ${}^L G$ of a reductive group G and certain equivariant perverse sheaves on the affine Grassmannian associated to G. This equivalence provides a non-combinatorial construction of the Langlands dual group. It is proved by showing that the mentioned category of perverse sheaves is a Tannakian category and identifying its Tannaka dual group with ${}^L G$.

== Extensions ==
Wedhorn (2004) has established partial Tannaka duality results in the situation where the category is R-linear, where R is no longer a field (as in classical Tannakian duality), but certain valuation rings. Iwanari (2018) has initiated and developed Tannaka duality in the context of infinity-categories.
