= Neukirch–Uchida theorem =

Algebraic number fields are determined by their absolute Galois groups

In mathematics, the Neukirch–Uchida theorem shows that all problems about algebraic number fields can be reduced to problems about their absolute Galois groups. Jürgen Neukirch showed that two algebraic number fields with the same absolute Galois group are isomorphic, and Kôji Uchida strengthened this by proving Neukirch's conjecture that automorphisms of the algebraic number field correspond to outer automorphisms of its absolute Galois group. Florian Pop extended the result to infinite fields that are finitely generated over prime fields.

The Neukirch–Uchida theorem is one of the foundational results of anabelian geometry, whose main theme is to reduce properties of geometric objects to properties of their fundamental groups, provided these fundamental groups are sufficiently non-abelian.

== Statement ==
Let $K_1$, $K_2$ be two algebraic number fields. The Neukirch–Uchida theorem says that, for every topological group isomorphism

$$\phi:\operatorname{Gal}(\bar K_1/K_1)\to\operatorname{Gal}(\bar K_2/K_2)$$

of absolute Galois groups, regarded as topological groups with respect to the Krull topology, there exists a unique field isomorphism $\sigma:\bar K_1\to\bar K_2$ such that

$$\sigma(K_1)=K_2$$

and

$$\phi(g)=\sigma\circ g\circ\sigma^{-1}$$

for every $g\in\operatorname{Gal}(\bar K_1/K_1)$. The following diagram illustrates this condition.

$$\begin{matrix}
K_1 & \hookrightarrow & \bar{K_1} & \xrightarrow[\cong]g & \bar{K_1} \\
{\scriptstyle\sigma|_{K_1}}\downarrow & & \downarrow{\scriptstyle\sigma} & & \downarrow{\scriptstyle\sigma} \\
K_2 & \hookrightarrow & \bar{K_2} & \xrightarrow[\phi(g)]{\cong} & \bar{K_2}
\end{matrix}$$

In particular, for algebraic number fields $K_1$, $K_2$, the following two conditions are equivalent.

- $\operatorname{Gal}(\bar{K_1}/K_1)\cong\operatorname{Gal}(\bar{K_2}/K_2)$
- $K_1\cong K_2$
