= Profinite integer =

Number-theoretic concept

In mathematics, a profinite integer is an element of the ring (sometimes pronounced as zee-hat or zed-hat)

$$\widehat{\mathbb{Z}} = \varprojlim \mathbb{Z}/n\mathbb{Z},$$

where the inverse limit of the quotient rings $\mathbb{Z}/n\mathbb{Z}$ runs through all natural numbers $n$, partially ordered by divisibility. By definition, this ring is the profinite completion of the integers $\mathbb{Z}$. By the Chinese remainder theorem, $\widehat{\mathbb{Z}}$ can also be understood as the direct product of rings

$$\widehat{\mathbb{Z}} = \prod_p \mathbb{Z}_p,$$

where the index $p$ runs over all prime numbers, and $\mathbb{Z}_p$ is the ring of p-adic integers. This group is important because of its relation to Galois theory, étale homotopy theory, and the ring of adeles. In addition, it provides a basic tractable example of a profinite group.

== Construction ==
The profinite integers $\widehat{\Z}$ can be constructed as the set of sequences $\upsilon$ of residues represented as
$$\upsilon = (\upsilon_1 \bmod 1, ~ \upsilon_2 \bmod 2, ~ \upsilon_3 \bmod 3, ~ \ldots)$$
such that $m \ |\ n \implies \upsilon_m \equiv \upsilon_n \!\!\!\!\!\pmod{m}$. Pointwise addition and multiplication make it a commutative ring.

The ring of integers embeds into the ring of profinite integers by the canonical injection
$$\eta: \mathbb{Z} \hookrightarrow \widehat{\mathbb{Z}},$$
where $n \mapsto (n \bmod 1, n \bmod 2, \dots).$ It is canonical since it satisfies the universal property of profinite groups that, given any profinite group $H$ and any group homomorphism $f : \Z \rightarrow H$, there exists a unique continuous group homomorphism $g : \widehat{\Z} \rightarrow H$ with $f = g \eta$.

=== Using the factorial number system ===
Every integer $n \ge 0$ has a unique representation in the factorial number system as
$$n = \sum_{i=1}^\infty c_i i! \quad \text{with } c_i \in \Z,$$
where $0 \le c_i \le i$ for every $i$, and only finitely many of $c_1,c_2,c_3,\ldots$ are nonzero. This can be written as $(\cdots c_3 c_2 c_1)_!$.

In the same way, a profinite integer can be uniquely represented in the factorial number system as an infinite string $(\cdots c_3 c_2 c_1)_!$, where each $c_i$ is an integer satisfying $0 \le c_i \le i$. The digits $c_1, c_2, c_3, \ldots, c_{k-1}$ determine the value of the profinite integer modulo $k!$. More specifically, there is a ring homomorphism $\widehat{\Z}\to \Z / k! \, \Z$ sending
$$(\cdots c_3 c_2 c_1)_! \mapsto \sum_{i=1}^{k-1} c_i i! \bmod k!$$
The difference of a profinite integer from an integer is that the "finitely many nonzero digits" condition is dropped, allowing for its factorial number representation to have infinitely many nonzero digits.

=== Using the Chinese remainder theorem ===
Another way to understand the construction of the profinite integers is by using the Chinese remainder theorem. Recall that for an integer $n$ with prime factorization
$$n = p_1^{a_1}\cdots p_k^{a_k}$$
of non-repeating primes, there is a ring isomorphism
$$\mathbb{Z}/n \cong \mathbb{Z}/p_1^{a_1}\times \cdots \times \mathbb{Z}/p_k^{a_k}$$
from the theorem. Moreover, any surjection
$$\mathbb{Z}/n \to \mathbb{Z}/m$$
will just be a map on the underlying decompositions where there are induced surjections
$$\mathbb{Z}/p_i^{a_i} \to \mathbb{Z}/p_i^{b_i}$$
since we must have $a_i \geq b_i$. Under the inverse limit definition of the profinite integers, we have the isomorphism
$$\widehat{\mathbb{Z}} \cong \prod_p \mathbb{Z}_p$$
with the direct product of p-adic integers. Explicitly, the isomorphism is $\phi: \prod_p \mathbb{Z}_p \to \widehat\Z$ by
$$\phi((n_2, n_3, n_5, \cdots))(k) = \prod_{q} n_q \bmod k,$$
where $q$ ranges over all prime-power factors $p_i^{d_i}$ of $k$; that is, $k = \prod_{i=1}^l p_i^{d_i}$ for some different prime numbers $p_1, ..., p_l$.

== Relations ==
=== Topological properties ===
The set of profinite integers has an induced topology in which it is a compact Hausdorff space (in fact, a Stone space) arising from the fact that it can be seen as a closed subset of the infinite direct product
$$\widehat{\mathbb{Z}} \subset \prod_{n=1}^\infty \mathbb{Z}/n\mathbb{Z},$$
which is compact with its product topology by Tychonoff's theorem. The topology on each finite group $\mathbb{Z}/n\mathbb{Z}$ is given as the discrete topology.

The topology on $\widehat{\Z}$ can be defined by the metric
$$d(x,y) = \frac1{ \min\{ k \in \Z_{>0} : x \not\equiv y \bmod{(k+1)!} \} }.$$
Since addition of profinite integers is continuous, $\widehat{\mathbb{Z}}$ is a compact Hausdorff abelian group, and thus its Pontryagin dual must be a discrete abelian group. In fact, the Pontryagin dual of $\widehat{\mathbb{Z}}$ is the abelian group $\mathbb{Q}/\mathbb{Z}$ equipped with the discrete topology (note that it is not the subset topology inherited from $\R/\Z$, which is not discrete). The Pontryagin dual is explicitly constructed by the function
$$\mathbb{Q}/\mathbb{Z} \times \widehat{\mathbb{Z}} \to U(1), \, (q, a) \mapsto \chi(qa),$$
where $\chi$ is the character of the adele (introduced below) $\mathbf{A}_{\mathbb{Q}, f}$ induced by $\mathbb{Q}/\mathbb{Z} \to U(1), \, \alpha \mapsto e^{2\pi i\alpha}$.

=== Relation with adeles ===
The tensor product $\widehat{\mathbb{Z}} \otimes_{\mathbb{Z}} \mathbb{Q}$ is the ring of finite adeles
$$\mathbf{A}_{\mathbb{Q}, f} = {\prod_p}' \mathbb{Q}_p$$
of $\mathbb{Q}$, where the symbol $'$ indicates a restricted product. That is, an element is a sequence that is integral except at a finite number of places. There is an isomorphism
$$\mathbf{A}_\mathbb{Q} \cong \mathbb{R}\times(\widehat{\mathbb{Z}}\otimes_\mathbb{Z}\mathbb{Q}).$$

=== Applications in Galois theory and étale homotopy theory ===
For the algebraic closure $\overline{\mathbf{F}}_q$ of a finite field $\mathbf{F}_q$ of order q, the Galois group can be computed explicitly. From the fact $\text{Gal}(\mathbf{F}_{q^n}/\mathbf{F}_q) \cong \mathbb{Z}/n\mathbb{Z}$ where the automorphisms are given by the Frobenius endomorphism, the Galois group of the algebraic closure of $\mathbf{F}_q$ is given by the inverse limit of the groups $\mathbb{Z}/n\mathbb{Z}$, so its Galois group is isomorphic to the group of profinite integers
$$\operatorname{Gal}(\overline{\mathbf{F}}_q/\mathbf{F}_q) \cong \widehat{\mathbb{Z}},$$
which gives a computation of the absolute Galois group of a finite field.

==== Relation with étale fundamental groups of algebraic tori ====
This construction can be reinterpreted in many ways. One of them is from étale homotopy type, which defines the étale fundamental group $\pi_1^{et}(X)$ as the profinite completion of automorphisms
$$\pi_1^{et}(X) = \lim_{i \in I} \text{Aut}(X_i/X),$$
where $X_i \to X$ is an étale cover. Then, the profinite integers are isomorphic to the group
$$\pi_1^{et}(\text{Spec}(\mathbf{F}_q)) \cong \widehat{\mathbb{Z}}$$
from the earlier computation of the profinite Galois group. In addition, there is an embedding of the profinite integers inside the étale fundamental group of the algebraic torus
$$\widehat{\mathbb{Z}} \hookrightarrow \pi_1^{et}(\mathbb{G}_m),$$
since the covering maps come from the polynomial maps
$$(\cdot)^n:\mathbb{G}_m \to \mathbb{G}_m$$
from the map of commutative rings
$$f:\mathbb{Z}[x,x^{-1}] \to \mathbb{Z}[x,x^{-1}]$$
sending $x \mapsto x^n$ since $\mathbb{G}_m = \text{Spec}(\mathbb{Z}[x,x^{-1}])$. If the algebraic torus is considered over a field $k$, then the étale fundamental group $\pi_1^{et}(\mathbb{G}_m/\text{Spec(k)})$ contains an action of $\text{Gal}(\overline{k}/k)$ as well from the fundamental exact sequence in étale homotopy theory.

=== Class field theory and the profinite integers ===
Class field theory is a branch of algebraic number theory studying the abelian field extensions of a field. Given the global field $\mathbb{Q}$, the abelianization of its absolute Galois group
$$\text{Gal}(\overline{\mathbb{Q}}/\mathbb{Q})^{ab}$$
is intimately related to the associated ring of adeles $\mathbb{A}_\mathbb{Q}$ and the group of profinite integers. In particular, there is a map, called the Artin map
$$\Psi_\mathbb{Q}:\mathbb{A}_\mathbb{Q}^\times / \mathbb{Q}^\times \to
\text{Gal}(\overline{\mathbb{Q}}/\mathbb{Q})^{ab},$$
which is an isomorphism. This quotient can be determined explicitly as
$$\begin{align}
\mathbb{A}_\mathbb{Q}^\times/\mathbb{Q}^\times &\cong (\mathbb{R}\times \widehat{\mathbb{Z}})/\mathbb{Z} \\
&= \underset{\leftarrow}{\lim} \mathbb({\mathbb{R}}/m\mathbb{Z}) \\
&= \underset{x \mapsto x^m}{\lim} S^1 \\
&= \widehat{\mathbb{Z}},
\end{align}$$
giving the desired relation. There is an analogous statement for local class field theory since every finite abelian extension of $K/\mathbb{Q}_p$ is induced from a finite field extension $\mathbb{F}_{p^n}/\mathbb{F}_p$.

== See also ==
- Ring of adeles
- Supernatural number
