= Anabelian geometry =

Theory in number theory

Anabelian geometry is a theory in arithmetic geometry which describes the way in which the algebraic fundamental group of a certain arithmetic variety X, or some related geometric object, can help to recover X. The first results for number fields and their absolute Galois groups were obtained by Jürgen Neukirch, Masatoshi Gündüz Ikeda, Kenkichi Iwasawa, and Kôji Uchida (Neukirch–Uchida theorem, 1969), prior to conjectures made about hyperbolic curves over number fields by Alexander Grothendieck. As introduced in Letter to Faltings (1983; see also Esquisse d'un Programme in 1984) the latter were about how topological homomorphisms between two arithmetic fundamental groups of two hyperbolic curves over number fields correspond to maps between the curves. A first version of Grothendieck's anabelian conjecture was solved by Hiroaki Nakamura and Akio Tamagawa (for affine curves), then completed by Shinichi Mochizuki.

The theory has since grown in varieties (absolute, mono-anabelian, and combinatorial versions) and with multiple interactions with number theory, algebraic geometry, and low-dimensional topology.

== Formulation of a conjecture of Grothendieck on curves ==
The "anabelian question" has been formulated as

How much information about the isomorphism class of the variety X is contained in the knowledge of the étale fundamental group

A concrete example is the case of curves, which may be affine as well as projective. Suppose given a hyperbolic curve C, i.e., the complement of n points in a projective algebraic curve of genus g, taken to be smooth and irreducible, defined over a field K that is finitely generated (over its prime field), such that

$$2 - 2g - n < 0$$.

Grothendieck conjectured that the algebraic fundamental group G of C, a profinite group, determines C itself (i.e., the isomorphism class of G determines that of C). This was proved by Mochizuki. An example is for the case of $g = 0$ (the projective line) and $n = 4$, when the isomorphism class of C is determined by the cross-ratio in K of the four points removed (almost, there being an order to the four points in a cross-ratio, but not in the points removed). There are also results for the case of K a local field.

== Mono-anabelian geometry ==
Shinichi Mochizuki introduced and developed the mono-anabelian geometry, an approach which restores, for a certain class of hyperbolic curves over number fields or some other fields, the curve from its algebraic fundamental group. Key results of mono-anabelian geometry were published in Mochizuki's "Topics in Absolute Anabelian Geometry" I (2012), II (2013), and III (2015).

The opposite approach of mono-anabelian geometry is bi-anabelian geometry, a term coined by Mochizuki in "Topics in Absolute Anabelian Geometry III" to indicate the classical approach.

Mono-anabelian geometry deals with certain types (strictly Belyi type) of hyperbolic curves over number fields and local fields. This theory considerably extends anabelian geometry. Its main aim to construct algorithms which produce the curve, up to an isomorphism, from the étale fundamental group of such a curve. In particular, for the first time this theory produces a simultaneous functorial restoration of the ground number field and its completion, from the fundamental group of a large class of punctured elliptic curves over number fields. Inter-universal Teichmüller theory of Shinichi Mochizuki is closely connected to and uses various results of mono-anabelian geometry in their absolute form.

== Combinatorial anabelian geometry ==
Shinichi Mochizuki also introduced combinatorial anabelian geometry which deals with issues of hyperbolic curves and other related schemes over algebraically closed fields. The first results were published in Mochizuki's "A combinatorial version of the Grothendieck conjecture" (2007) and "On the combinatorial cuspidalization of hyperbolic curves" (2010). The field was later applied to hyperbolic curves by Yuichiro Hoshi and Mochizuki in a series of four papers, "Topics surrounding the combinatorial anabelian geometry of hyperbolic curves" (2012-2013).

Combinatorial anabelian geometry concerns the reconstruction of scheme- or ring-theoretic objects from more primitive combinatorial constituent data. The origin of combinatorial anabelian geometry is in some of such combinatorial ideas of the arithmetic of braid groups and their Lie algebras of Makoto Matsumoto et al., then later in Mochizuki's proofs of the Grothendieck conjecture. Some of the results of combinatorial anabelian geometry provide alternative proofs of partial cases of the Grothendieck conjecture without using p-adic Hodge theory. Combinatorial anabelian geometry helps to study various aspects of the Grothendieck–Teichmüller group and the absolute Galois groups of number fields and mixed-characteristic local fields.

== See also ==
- Section conjecture
- Class field theory
- Fiber functor
- Neukirch–Uchida theorem
- Belyi's theorem
- Inter-universal Teichmüller theory
