= Jean-Louis Verdier =

French mathematician

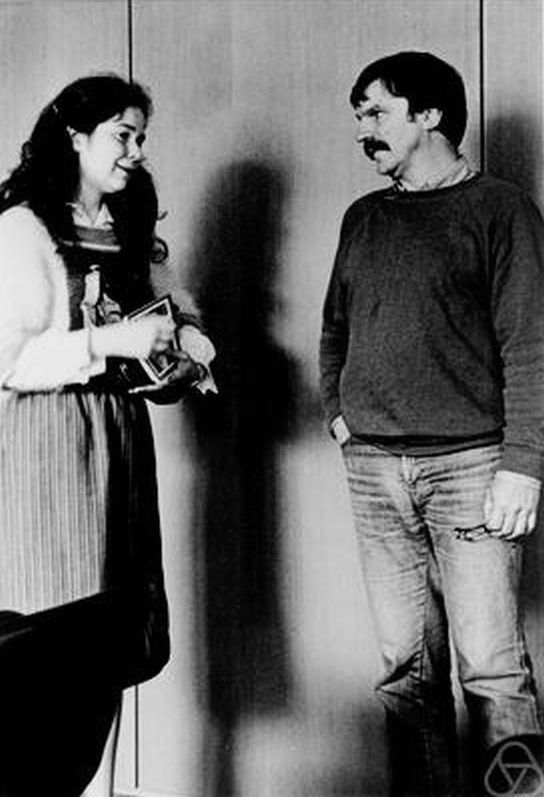
- Jean-Louis Verdier (right) and Emma Previato, Oberwolfach 1984
- Born: 2 February 1935
- Died: 25 August 1989 (aged 54)
- Education: University of Paris
- Known for: Verdier duality Verdier hypercovering theorem Artin–Verdier duality Serre–Grothendieck–Verdier duality Derived category Triangulated category
- Scientific career
- Fields: Mathematics
- Workplaces: Paris Diderot University
- Thesis: Des catégories dérivées des categories abéliennes (1967)
- Doctoral advisor: Alexander Grothendieck
- Doctoral students: Arnaud Beauville; Alain Lascoux

Jean-Louis Verdier (French: [vɛʁdje]; 2 February 1935 – 25 August 1989) was a French mathematician who worked, under the guidance of his doctoral advisor Alexander Grothendieck, on derived categories and Verdier duality. He was a close collaborator of Grothendieck, notably contributing to SGA 4 his theory of hypercovers and anticipating the later development of étale homotopy by Michael Artin and Barry Mazur, following a suggestion he attributed to Pierre Cartier. Saul Lubkin's related theory of rigid hypercovers was later taken up by Eric Friedlander in his definition of the étale topological type.

Verdier was a student at the elite École Normale Supérieure in Paris, and later became director of studies there, as well as a Professor at the University of Paris VII. For many years he directed a joint seminar at the École Normale Supérieure with Adrien Douady. Verdier was a member of Bourbaki. In 1984 he was the president of the Société Mathématique de France.

In 1976 Verdier developed a useful regularity condition on stratified sets that the Chinese-Australian mathematician Tzee-Char Kuo had previously shown implied the Whitney conditions for subanalytic sets (such as real or complex analytic varieties). Verdier called the condition (w) for Whitney, as at the time he thought (w) might be equivalent to Whitney's condition (b). Real algebraic examples for which the Whitney conditions (b) hold but Verdier's condition (w) fails, were constructed by David Trotman who has obtained many geometric properties of (w)-regular stratifications. Work of Bernard Teissier, aided by Jean-Pierre Henry and Michel Merle at the École Polytechnique, led to the 1982 result that Verdier's condition (w) is equivalent to the Whitney conditions for complex analytic stratifications.

Verdier later worked on the theory of integrable systems.

== Bibliography ==
- Verdier's 1967 thesis, published belatedly in:
  Verdier, Jean-Louis (1996). "Des Catégories Dérivées des Catégories Abéliennes". Astérisque (in French). 239. Société Mathématique de France, Marseilles.

Part of it also appears in SGA 4½ as the last chapter, "Catégories dérivées (état 0)".

- Verdier, Jean-Louis (1976). "Stratifications de Whitney et théorème de Bertini-Sard". Inventiones Mathematicae. 36: 295–312. Bibcode:1976InMat..36..295V. doi:10.1007/BF01390015. MR 0481096. S2CID 118086083.
- Integrable Systems, The Verdier Memorial Conference (Actes du Colloque International de Luminy, 1991), Progress in Mathematics 115, edited by O. Babelon, P. Cartier, Y. Kosmann-Schwarzbach, Birkhäuser, 1993.

== See also ==
- Artin–Verdier duality
