= Severi variety =

In algebraic geometry, a Severi variety, named after Francesco Severi, may be:

- a Brauer–Severi variety
- A Severi variety, a variety contained in a Hilbert scheme that parametrizes curves in projective space with given degree, arithmetic genus, and number of nodes and no other singularities.
- a Scorza variety of dimension n in projective space of dimension 3n/2 + 2 that can be isomorphically projected to a hyperplane.
