= Jürgen Neukirch =

German mathematician

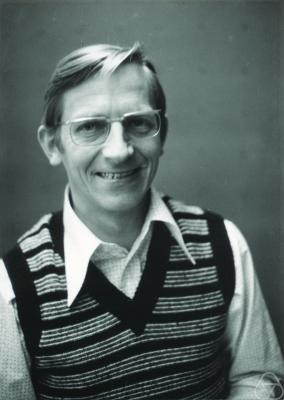
- Born: 24 July 1937; Dortmund, Westphalia
- Died: 5 February 1997 (aged 59); Regensburg, Bavaria
- Education: University of Bonn
- Scientific career
- Fields: Mathematics
- Workplaces: University of Regensburg
- Doctoral advisor: Wolfgang Krull
- Doctoral students: Pilar Bayer; Peter Schneider

Jürgen Neukirch (24 July 1937 – 5 February 1997) was a German mathematician known for his work on algebraic number theory.

== Education and career ==
Neukirch received his diploma in mathematics in 1964 from the University of Bonn. For his Ph.D. thesis, written under the direction of Wolfgang Krull, he was awarded in 1965 the Felix-Hausdorff-Gedächtnis-Preis. He completed his habilitation one year later. From 1967 to 1969 he was guest professor at Queen's University in Kingston, Ontario and at the Massachusetts Institute of Technology in Cambridge, Massachusetts, after which he was a professor in Bonn. In 1971 he became a professor at the University of Regensburg.

== Contributions ==
He is known for his work on the embedding problem in algebraic number theory, the Báyer–Neukirch theorem on special values of L-functions, arithmetic Riemann existence theorems and the Neukirch–Uchida theorem in birational anabelian geometry. He gave a simple description of the reciprocity maps in local and global class field theory.

== Books ==
Neukirch wrote three books on class field theory, algebraic number theory, and the cohomology of number fields:

- Neukirch, Jürgen (1986). Class Field Theory. Grundlehren der Mathematischen Wissenschaften. Vol. 280. Berlin: Springer-Verlag. ISBN 3-540-15251-2.
- Neukirch, Jürgen (1999). Algebraic Number Theory. Grundlehren der Mathematischen Wissenschaften. Vol. 322. Springer-Verlag. ISBN 978-3-540-65399-8. Zbl 0956.11021.
- Neukirch, Jürgen; Schmidt, Alexander; Wingberg, Kay (2008). Cohomology of Number Fields. Grundlehren der Mathematischen Wissenschaften. Vol. 323 (2nd ed.). Springer-Verlag. ISBN 978-3-540-37888-4. Zbl 1136.11001.
- Neukirch, Jürgen (2013). Class Field Theory — The Bonn Lectures. Springer. ISBN 978-3-642-35436-6.
