= Icosian game =

Game of finding cycles on a dodecahedron

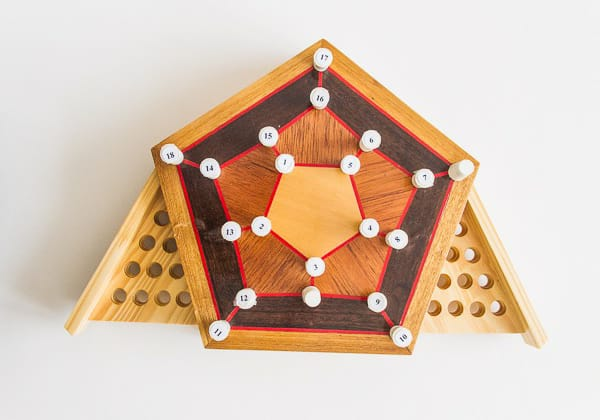
Modern reconstruction of Hamilton's icosian game, on display at the Institute of Mathematics and Statistics, University of São Paulo

The icosian game is a mathematical game invented in 1856 by Irish mathematician William Rowan Hamilton. It involves finding a Hamiltonian cycle on a dodecahedron, a polygon using edges of the dodecahedron that passes through all its vertices. Hamilton's invention of the game came from his studies of symmetry, and from his invention of the icosian calculus, a mathematical system describing the symmetries of the dodecahedron.

Hamilton sold his work to a game manufacturing company, and it was marketed both in the UK and Europe, but it was too easy to become commercially successful. Only a small number of copies of it are known to survive in museums. Although Hamilton was not the first to study Hamiltonian cycles, his work on this game became the origin of the name of Hamiltonian cycles. Several works of recreational mathematics studied his game. Other puzzles based on Hamiltonian cycles are sold as smartphone apps, and mathematicians continue to study combinatorial games based on Hamiltonian cycles.

== Game play ==
A Hamiltonian cycle on a dodecahedron

Planar view of the same cycle

The game's object is to find a three-dimensional polygon made from the edges of a regular dodecahedron, passing exactly once through each vertex of the dodecahedron. A polygon visiting all vertices in this way is now called a Hamiltonian cycle. In a two-player version of the game, one player starts by choosing five consecutive vertices along the polygon, and the other player must complete the polygon.

Édouard Lucas describes the shape of any possible solution, in a way that can be remembered by game players. A completed polygon must cut the twelve faces of the dodecahedron into two strips of six pentagons. As this strip passes through each of its four middle pentagons, in turn, it connects through two edges of each pentagon that are not adjacent, making either a shallow left turn or a shallow right turn through the pentagon. In this way, the strip makes two left turns and then two right turns, or vice versa.

One version of the game took the form of a flat wooden board inscribed with a planar graph with the same combinatorial structure as the dodecahedron (a Schlegel diagram), with holes for numbered pegs to be placed at its vertices. The polygon found by game players was indicated by the consecutive numbering of the pegs. Another version was shaped as a "partially flattened dodecahedron", a roughly hemispherical dome with the pentagons of a dodecahedron spread on its curved surface and a handle attached to its flat base. The vertices had fixed pegs. A separate string, with a loop at one end, was wound through these pegs to indicate the polygon.

The game was too easy to play to achieve much popularity, although Hamilton tried to counter this impression by giving an example of an academic colleague who failed to solve it. David Darling suggests that Hamilton may have made it much more difficult for himself than for others, by using his theoretical methods to solve it instead of trial and error.

== Background ==
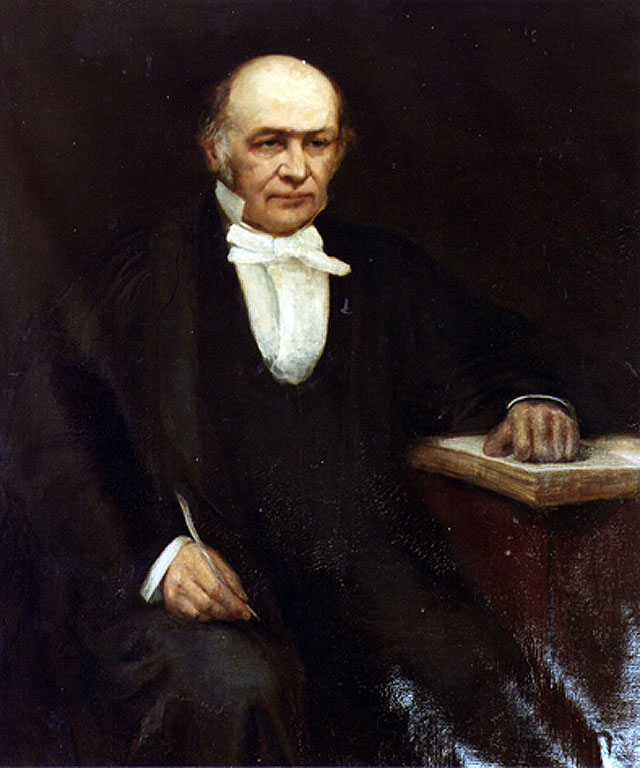
William Rowan Hamilton, the inventor of the icosian game

At the time of his invention of the icosian game, William Rowan Hamilton was the Andrews Professor of Astronomy at Trinity College Dublin and Royal Astronomer of Ireland, and was already famous for his work on Hamiltonian mechanics and his invention of quaternions. The motivation for Hamilton was the problem of understanding the symmetries of the dodecahedron and icosahedron, two dual polyhedra that have the same symmetries as each other. For this purpose he also invented icosian calculus, a system of non-commutative algebra which he used to compute these symmetries.

The name of the icosian game comes from the fact that the icosahedron has twenty faces, the dodecahedron has twenty vertices, and any polygon through all the vertices of the dodecahedron has twenty edges. Icosa is a Greek root meaning twenty. On a dodecahedron with labeled vertices, there are 30 different ways that these vertices could be connected to each other to form a Hamiltonian cycle. However, without the labels, all Hamiltonian cycles are symmetric to each other under rotations and reflections of the dodecahedron.

== History ==
Both the icosian calculus and the icosian game were outlined by Hamilton in a series of letters to his friend John T. Graves in late 1856. Hamilton then exhibited the game at the 1857 Dublin meeting of the British Association for the Advancement of Science. At the suggestion of Graves, Hamilton sold its publishing rights to Jaques and Son, a London-based toy and game manufacturing company.

Jaques & Son sold Hamilton's game beginning in 1859. It was marketed in both its handheld solid and flat forms, under the titles The Travellers Dodecahedron, or a voyage around the world, and The Icosian Game, invented by Sir William Rowan Hamilton, Royal Astronomer of Ireland; forming a new and highly amusing game for the drawing room, particularly interesting to students in mathematics of illustrating the principles of the Icosian Calculus.

Several versions of the game were sold in Europe. However, it was not a commercial success. Hamilton received only a £25 licensing fee from Jaques and Son for his invention (present value £2700). Few original copies of the game are known to survive, but one is kept in the library of the Royal Irish Academy in Dublin, and another is included in the collection of the Conservatoire national des arts et métiers in Paris, both in the flat form of the game.

== Legacy ==
Although Hamilton invented the icosian game independently, he was not the first to study Hamiltonian cycles. Knight's tours on chessboards, another puzzle based on Hamiltonian cycles, go back to the 9th century, both in India and in mathematics in the medieval Islamic world. At about the same time as Hamilton, Thomas Kirkman in England was also studying Hamiltonian cycles on polyhedra. Hamilton visited Kirkman in 1861, and presented him with a copy of the icosian game. Despite this related work, some of which was much earlier, Hamiltonian cycles came to be named for Hamilton and for his work on the icosian game.

The icosian game itself has been the topic of multiple works in recreational mathematics by well-known authors on the subject including Édouard Lucas, Wilhelm Ahrens, and Martin Gardner. Puzzles like Hamilton's icosian game, based on finding Hamiltonian cycles in planar graphs, continue to be sold as smartphone apps. Maker-Breaker games based on Hamiltonian cycles were introduced to combinatorial game theory in a 1978 paper by Václav Chvátal and Paul Erdős, and continue to be studied in mathematics.

== See also ==
- Hunt the Wumpus, another game played on the graph of a dodecahedron
- Seven Bridges of Königsberg, a puzzle of finding a cycle through all edges of a graph
