= Krull's separation lemma =

In abstract algebra, Krull's separation lemma is a lemma in ring theory. It was proved by Wolfgang Krull in 1928.

== Statement of the lemma ==
Let $I$ be an ideal and let $M$ be a multiplicative system (i.e. $M$ is closed under multiplication) in a ring $R$, and suppose $I \cap M = \varnothing$. Then there exists a prime ideal $P$ satisfying $I \subseteq P$ and $P \cap M = \varnothing$.
