= Hypercovering =

In mathematics, and in particular homotopy theory, a hypercovering (or hypercover) is a simplicial object that generalises the Čech nerve of a cover. For the Čech nerve of an open cover $\mathcal U\to X$, one can show that if the space $X$ is compact and if every intersection of open sets in the cover is contractible, then one can contract these sets and get a simplicial set that is weakly equivalent to $X$ in a natural way. For the étale topology and other sites, these conditions fail. The idea of a hypercover is to instead of only working with $n$-fold intersections of the sets of the given open cover $\mathcal U$, to allow the pairwise intersections of the sets in $\mathcal U=\mathcal U_0$ to be covered by an open cover $\mathcal U_1$, and to let the triple intersections of this cover to be covered by yet another open cover $\mathcal U_2$, and so on, iteratively. Hypercoverings have a central role in étale homotopy and other areas where homotopy theory is applied to algebraic geometry, such as motivic homotopy theory.

== Formal definition ==
The original definition given for étale cohomology by Jean-Louis Verdier in SGA4, Expose V, Sec. 7, Thm. 7.4.1, to compute sheaf cohomology in arbitrary Grothendieck topologies. For the étale site the definition is the following:

Let $X$ be a scheme and consider the category of schemes étale over $X$. A hypercover is a semisimplicial object $U_\bullet$ of this category such that $U_0 \to X$ is an étale cover and such that $U_{n+1} \to \left(\left(\operatorname{\mathbf{cosk}}_n:= \operatorname{cosk}_n\circ\operatorname{tr}_n\right) U_\bullet\right)_{n+1}$ is an étale cover for every $n\geq 0$.

Here, $U_{n+1} \to \left(\operatorname{\mathbf{cosk}}_n U_\bullet\right)_{n+1}$ is the limit of the diagram which has one copy of $U_i$ for each $i$-dimensional face of the standard $n+1$-simplex (for $0 \leq i \leq n$), one morphism for every inclusion of faces, and the augmentation map $U_0 \to X$ at the end. The morphisms are given by the boundary maps of the semisimplicial object $U_\bullet$.

== Properties ==
The Verdier hypercovering theorem states that the abelian sheaf cohomology of an étale sheaf can be computed as a colimit of the cochain cohomologies over all hypercovers.

For a locally Noetherian scheme $X$, the category $HR(X)$ of hypercoverings modulo simplicial homotopy is cofiltering, and thus gives a pro-object in the homotopy category of simplicial sets. The geometrical realisation of this is the Artin-Mazur homotopy type. A generalisation of E. Friedlander using bisimplicial hypercoverings of simplicial schemes is called the étale topological type.
