= Pilar Bayer =

Spanish mathematician (born 1946)

Pilar Bayer Isant
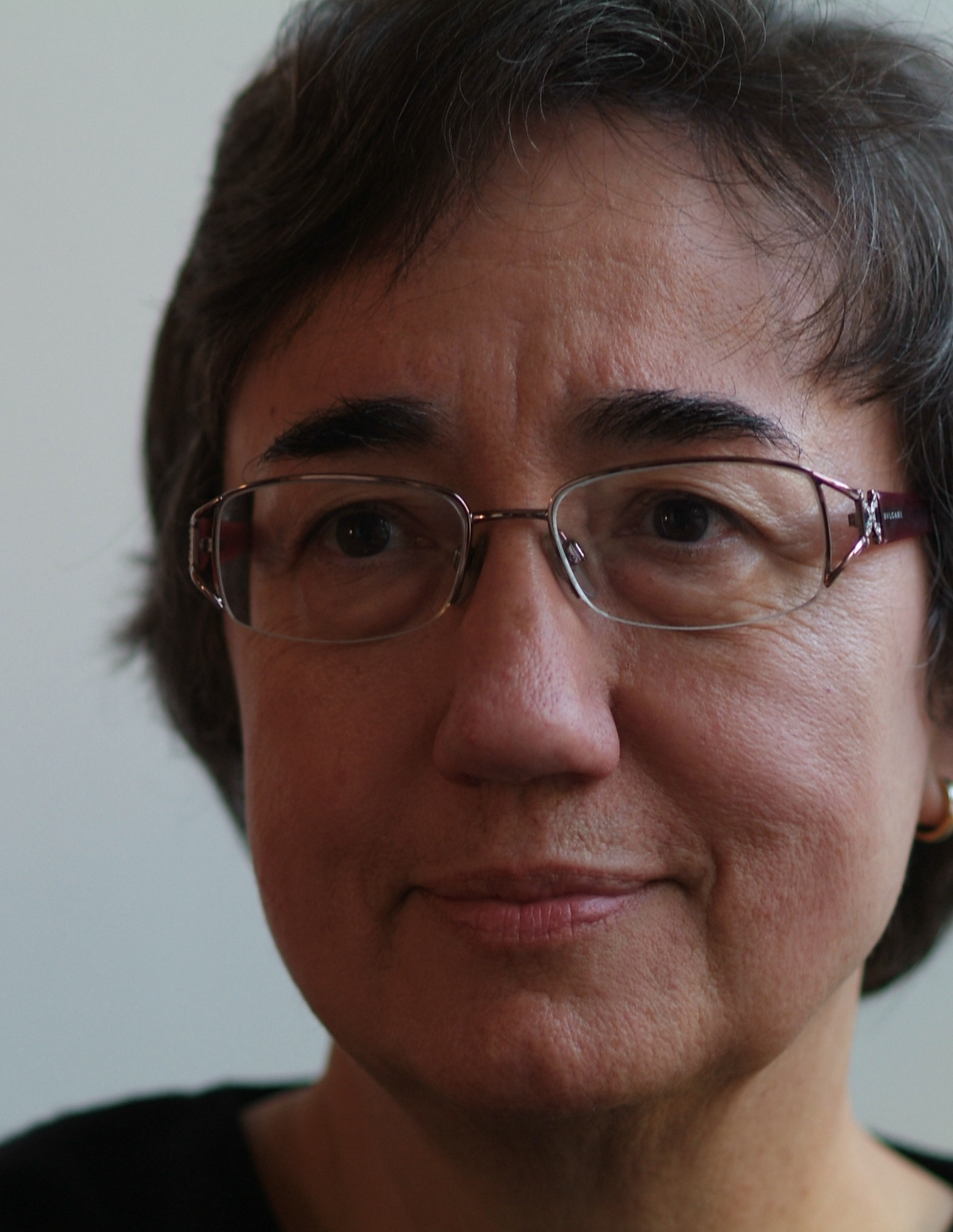
- Pilar Bayer
- Born: February 13, 1946 (age 80); Barcelona, Spain
- Education: University of Barcelona
- Known for: Number theory, quaternion algebras, Shimura curves
- Awards: Narcís Monturiol Medal (1998), Serra d'Or Critic's Prize (2013)
- Scientific career
- Fields: Mathematics
- Workplaces: University of Barcelona
- Doctoral advisor: Rafael Mallol Balmaña, Jürgen Neukirch

Pilar Bayer Isant (born 1946) is a Spanish mathematician specializing in number theory. She is a professor emerita in the Faculty of Mathematics and Computer Science of the University of Barcelona.

== Education and career ==
Bayer was born in Barcelona on February 13, 1946. Before becoming a mathematician, she was certified as a piano teacher by the Municipal Conservatory of Barcelona in 1967.

She graduated from the University of Barcelona in 1968, and completed her Ph.D. there in 1975. Her dissertation, Extensiones maximales de un cuerpo global en las que un divisor primo descompone completamente, was jointly supervised by Rafael Mallol Balmaña and Jürgen Neukirch. She was one of the first two women to earn a Ph.D. from the university; the other was her high school teacher.

She was an assistant at Universität Regensburg from 1977 to 1980. After briefly working for the University of Santander and Autonomous University of Barcelona, she joined the faculty at the University of Barcelona in 1982. She retired in 2016.

== Contributions ==
With Montserrat Alsina, Bayer is the author of the book Quaternion Orders, Quadratic Forms, and Shimura Curves (American Mathematical Society, 2004). As well as quaternion algebras, Eichler orders, quadratic forms, and Shimura curves (the subject of the book), other topics in her research include automorphic forms, diophantine equations, elliptic curves, modular curves, and zeta functions.

Beyond number theory, with Jordi Guàrdia and Artur Travesa she is the author of Arrels germàniques de la matemàtica contemporània: amb una antologia de textos matemàtics de 1850 a 1950 (Institut d'Estudis Catalans, 2012), on the history of mathematics in Germany from the mid-19th century to the mid-20th century. In total she is an author or editor of 19 books.

== Recognition ==
Bayer won the Narcís Monturiol Medal of the Generalitat de Catalunya in 1998. Her book Arrels germàniques de la matemàtica contemporània: amb una antologia de textos matemàtics de 1850 a 1950 won the Serra d'Or Critic's Prize in 2013.

She was Emmy Noether Visiting Professor at the University of Göttingen in 2004. She is an academician of the Spanish Royal Academy of Sciences, the Royal European Academy of Doctors, the Royal Academy of Sciences and Arts of Barcelona, and the Institute for Catalan Studies.

In honor of her 70th birthday, the University of Barcelona published a two-volume edition of her selected works in 2016.
