= Gennady Belyi =

Soviet, Ukrainian, and Russian mathematician

Gennadiĭ Belyĭ
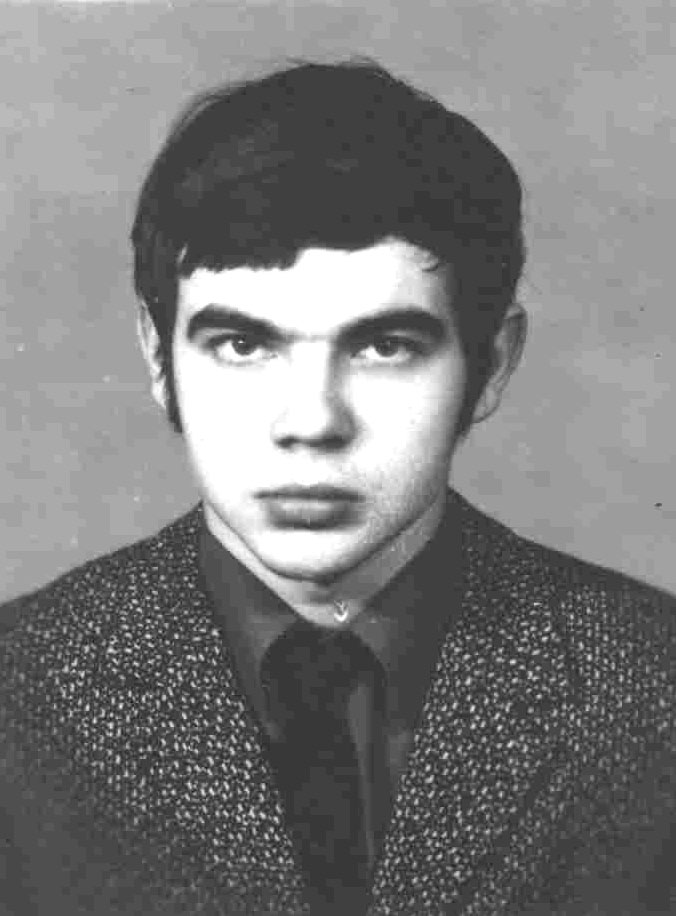
- G. Belyĭ in 1973
- Born: February 2, 1951; Magnitogorsk, Soviet Union
- Died: January 29, 2001; Vladimir, Russia
- Education: Moscow State University
- Known for: Belyi's theorem Belyi's function
- Scientific career
- Fields: Mathematics
- Doctoral advisor: Igor Shafarevich

Gennadii Vladimirovich Belyi (1951–2001, Ukrainian: Генадій Володимирович Білий, Russian: Геннадий Владимирович Белый) was a Soviet, Ukrainian, and Russian mathematician, known for Belyi's theorem on the representation of algebraic curves as Riemann surfaces and for the Belyi functions arising within that theorem.

Belyi was born on February 2, 1951, in Magnitogorsk, Russia, then part of the Soviet Union. His family moved from there to Ukraine, and he began his studies at the Kiev Physics and Mathematics School but moved from there to Moscow State University. After completing his studies in 1973 he returned to Ukraine, working in Kiev and then Lviv. He became a graduate student at the Steklov Institute of Mathematics in Moscow in 1975, and studied there under the supervision of Igor Shafarevich, earning a candidate degree in 1979. He then took a faculty position at Vladimir State University, in Vladimir, Russia, where he remained for the remainder of his career. He died on January 29, 2001, in Vladimir.

Belyi won a prize of the Moscow Mathematical Society in 1981, and was an Invited Speaker at the International Congress of Mathematicians in 1986.
