= Icosian calculus =

Non-commutative algebraic structure

The icosian calculus is a non-commutative algebraic structure discovered by the Irish mathematician William Rowan Hamilton in 1856. In modern terms, he gave a group presentation of the icosahedral rotation group by generators and relations.

Hamilton's discovery derived from his attempts to find an algebra of "triplets" or 3-tuples that he believed would reflect the three Cartesian axes. The symbols of the icosian calculus correspond to moves between vertices on a dodecahedron. (Hamilton originally thought in terms of moves between the faces of an icosahedron, which is equivalent by duality. This is the origin of the name "icosian".) Hamilton's work in this area resulted indirectly in the terms Hamiltonian circuit and Hamiltonian path in graph theory. He also invented the icosian game as a means of illustrating and popularising his discovery.

== Informal definition ==
Stereographic projection of dodecahedron used for Hamilton's icosian game

The algebra is based on three symbols, $\iota$, $\kappa$, and $\lambda$, that Hamilton described as "roots of unity", by which he meant that repeated application of any of them a particular number of times yields the identity, which he denoted by 1. Specifically, they satisfy the relations

$$\begin{align}
\iota^2 & = 1, \\
\kappa^3 & = 1, \\
\lambda^5 & = 1.
\end{align}$$

Hamilton gives one additional relation between the symbols,

$$\lambda = \iota\kappa,$$

which is to be understood as application of $\kappa$ followed by application of $\iota$. Hamilton points out that application in the reverse order produces a different result, implying that composition or multiplication of symbols is not generally commutative, although it is associative. The symbols generate a group of order 60, isomorphic to the group of rotations of a regular icosahedron or dodecahedron, and therefore to the alternating group of degree five. This, however, is not how Hamilton described them.

Hamilton drew comparisons between the icosians and his system of quaternions, but noted that, unlike quaternions, which can be added and multiplied, obeying a distributive law, the icosians could only, as far as he knew, be multiplied.

Hamilton understood his symbols by reference to the dodecahedron, which he represented in flattened form as a graph in the plane. The dodecahedron has 30 edges, and if arrows are placed on edges, there are two possible arrow directions for each edge, resulting in 60 directed edges. Each symbol corresponds to a permutation of the set of directed edges. The definitions below refer to the labeled diagram above. The notation $(A,B)$ represents a directed edge from vertex $A$ to vertex $B$. Vertex $A$ is the tail of $(A,B)$ and vertex $B$ is its head.

Geometrical illustration of operation iota in icosian calculus

- The icosian symbol $\iota$ reverses the arrow on every directed edge, that is, it interchanges the head and tail. Hence $(B,C)$ is transformed into $(C,B)$. Similarly, applying $\iota$ to $(C,B)$ produces $(B,C)$, and to $(R,S)$ produces $(S,R)$.
- The icosian symbol $\kappa$, applied to a directed edge $e$, produces the directed edge that (1) has the same head as $e$ and that (2) is encountered first as one moves around the head of $e$ in the anticlockwise direction. Hence applying $\kappa$ to $(B,C)$ produces $(D,C)$, to $(C,B)$ produces $(Z,B)$, and to $(R,S)$ produces $(N,S)$.
- The icosian symbol $\lambda$ applied to a directed edge $e$ produces the directed edge that results from making a right turn at the head of $e$. Hence applying $\lambda$ to $(B,C)$ produces $(C,D)$, to $(C,B)$ produces $(B,A)$, and to $(R,S)$ produces $(S,N)$. Comparing the results of applying $\kappa$ and $\lambda$ to the same directed edge exhibits the rule $\lambda = \iota\kappa$.

It is useful to define the symbol $\mu$ for the operation that produces the directed edge that results from making a left turn at the head of the directed edge to which the operation is applied. This symbol satisfies the relations

$$\mu = \lambda\kappa = \iota\kappa^2.$$

For example, the directed edge obtained by making a left turn from $(B,C)$ is $(C,P)$. Indeed, $\kappa$ applied to $(B,C)$ produces $(D,C)$ and $\lambda$ applied to $(D,C)$ produces $(C,P)$. Also, $\kappa^2$ applied to $(B,C)$ produces $(P,C)$ and $\iota$ applied to $(P,C)$ produces $(C,P)$.

These permutations are not rotations of the dodecahedron. Nevertheless, the group of permutations generated by these symbols is isomorphic to the rotation group of the dodecahedron, a fact that can be deduced from a specific feature of symmetric cubic graphs, of which the dodecahedron graph is an example. The rotation group of the dodecahedron has the property that for a given directed edge there is a unique rotation that sends that directed edge to any other specified directed edge. Hence by choosing a reference edge, say $(B,C)$, a one-to-one correspondence between directed edges and rotations is established: let $g_E$ be the rotation that sends the reference edge $R$ to directed edge $E$. (Indeed, there are 60 directed edges and 60 rotations.) The rotations are permutations of the set of directed edges of a different sort. Let $g(E)$ denote the image of edge $E$ under the rotation $g$. The icosian associated to $g$ sends the reference edge $R$ to the same directed edge as does $g$, namely to $g(R)$. The result of applying that icosian to any other directed edge $E$ is $g_Eg(R) = g_Egg_E^{-1}(E)$.

== Application to Hamiltonian circuits on the edges of the dodecahedron ==
A word consisting of the symbols $\lambda$ and $\mu$ corresponds to a sequence of right and left turns in the graph. Specifying such a word along with an initial directed edge therefore specifies a directed path along the edges of the dodecahedron. If the group element represented by the word equals the identity, then the path returns to the initial directed edge in the final step. If the additional requirement is imposed that every vertex of the graph be visited exactly once—specifically that every vertex occur exactly once as the head of a directed edge in the path—then a Hamiltonian circuit is obtained. Finding such a circuit was one of the challenges posed by Hamilton's icosian game. Hamilton exhibited the word $(\lambda^3\mu^3(\lambda\mu)^2)^2$ with the properties described above. Any of the 60 directed edges may serve as initial edge as a consequence of the symmetry of the dodecahedron, but only 30 distinct Hamiltonian circuits are obtained in this way, up to shift in starting point, because the word consists of the same sequence of 10 left and right turns repeated twice. The word with the roles of $\lambda$ and $\mu$ interchanged has the same properties, but these give the same Hamiltonian cycles, up to shift in initial edge and reversal of direction. Hence Hamilton's word accounts for all Hamiltonian cycles in the dodecahedron, whose number is known to be 30.

== Legacy ==
The icosian calculus is one of the earliest examples of many mathematical ideas, including:

- presenting and studying a group by generators and relations;
- visualization of a group by a graph, which led to combinatorial group theory and later geometric group theory;
- Hamiltonian circuits and Hamiltonian paths in graph theory;
- dessin d'enfant – see dessin d'enfant: history for details.

== See also ==
- Icosian
