= Florian Pop =

Romanian mathematician

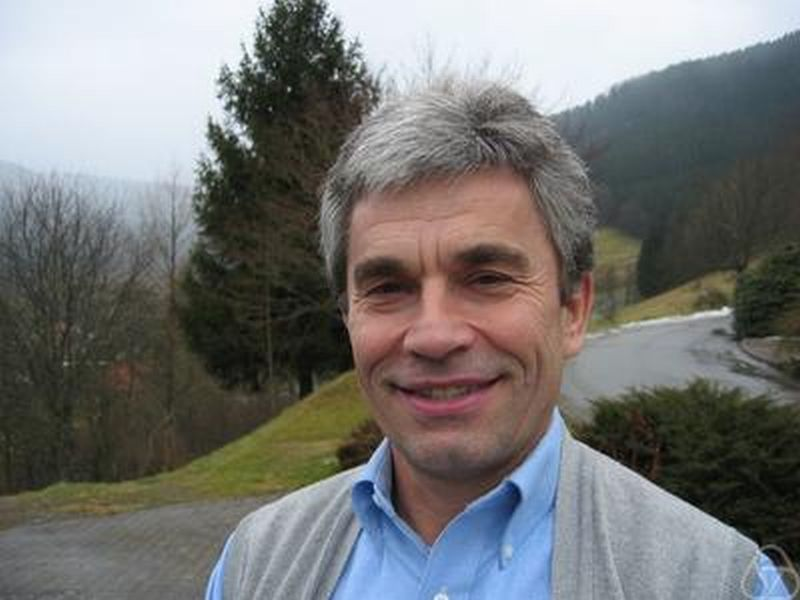
Florian Pop at Oberwolfach in 2006

Florian Pop (born 1952 in Zalău) is a Romanian mathematician, a professor of mathematics at the University of Pennsylvania.

Pop received his Ph.D. in 1987 and his habilitation in 1991, both from the University of Heidelberg. He has been a member of the Institute for Advanced Study in Princeton, and (from 1996 to 2003) a professor at the University of Bonn prior to joining the University of Pennsylvania faculty.

Pop's research concerns algebraic geometry, arithmetic geometry, anabelian geometry, and Galois theory. Kuhlmann, Kuhlmann & Marshall (2003) call his habilitation thesis, concerning the characterization of certain fields by their absolute Galois groups, a "milestone".

In 1996, Pop was awarded the Gay-Lussac–von Humboldt Prize for Mathematics, and in 2003 he was awarded the Romanian Order of Merit, Commander rank. In 2012 he became a fellow of the American Mathematical Society.

== Selected publications ==
- Pop, Florian (1990), "On the Galois theory of function fields of one variable over number fields", Journal für die reine und angewandte Mathematik, 1990 (406): 200–218, doi:10.1515/crll.1990.406.200, MR 1048241, S2CID 119934490
- Pop, Florian (1994), "On Grothendieck's conjecture of birational anabelian geometry", Annals of Mathematics, (2), 139 (1): 145–182, doi:10.2307/2946630, JSTOR 2946630, MR 1259367
- Pop, Florian (1995). "Étale Galois covers of affine smooth curves. The geometric case of a conjecture of Shafarevich. On Abhyankar's conjecture". Inventiones Mathematicae. 120 (1): 555–578. Bibcode:1995InMat.120..555P. doi:10.1007/bf01241142. MR 1334484. S2CID 128157587.
- Pop, Florian (1996), "Embedding problems over large fields", Annals of Mathematics, (2), 144 (1): 1–34, doi:10.2307/2118581, JSTOR 2118581, MR 1405941
- Szamuely, Tamás (2004), "Groupes de Galois de corps de type fini (d'après Pop)", Astérisque, 294: 403–431, MR 2111651
- Pop, Florian (2010). "Henselian implies large". Annals of Mathematics. 172 (3): 2183–2195. doi:10.4007/annals.2010.172.2183. MR 2726108.
