= Eventually stable polynomial =

A non-constant polynomial with coefficients in a field is said to be eventually stable if the number of irreducible factors of the $n$-fold iteration of the polynomial is eventually constant as a function of $n$. The terminology is due to R. Jones and A. Levy, who generalized the seminal notion of stability first introduced by R. Odoni.

== Definition ==
Let $K$ be a field and $f\in K[x]$ be a non-constant polynomial. The polynomial $f$ is called stable or dynamically irreducible if, for every natural number $n$, the $n$-fold composition $f^n=f\circ f \circ \ldots \circ f$ is irreducible over $K$.

A non-constant polynomial $g\in K[x]$ is called $f$-stable if, for every natural number $n\ge 1$, the composition $g\circ f^n$ is irreducible over $K$.

The polynomial $f$ is called eventually stable if there exists a natural number $N$ such that $f^N$ is a product of $f$-stable factors. Equivalently, $f$ is eventually stable if there exist natural numbers $N,r\ge 1$ such that for every $n\ge N$ the polynomial $f^n$ decomposes in $K[x]$ as a product of $r$ irreducible factors.

== Examples ==
- If $f=(x-\gamma)^2+c \in K[x]$ is such that $-c$ and $f^n(\gamma)$ are all non-squares in $K$ for every $n\ge 2$, then $f$ is stable. If $K$ is a finite field, the two conditions are equivalent.
- Let $f=x^d+c \in K[x]$ where $K$ is a field of characteristic not dividing $d$. If there exists a discrete non-archimedean absolute value on $K$ such that $|c|<1$, then $f$ is eventually stable. In particular, if $K=\mathbb Q$ and $c$ is not the reciprocal of an integer, then $x^d+c \in \mathbb Q[x]$ is eventually stable.

== Generalization to rational functions and arbitrary basepoints ==
Let $K$ be a field and $\phi\in K(x)$ be a rational function of degree at least $2$. Let $\alpha\in K$. For every natural number $n\ge 1$, let $\phi^n(x)=\frac{f_n(x)}{g_n(x)}$ for coprime $f_n(x),g_n(x)\in K[x]$.

We say that the pair $(\phi,\alpha)$ is eventually stable if there exist natural numbers $N,r$ such that for every $n\ge N$ the polynomial $f_n(x)-\alpha g_n(x)$ decomposes in $K[x]$ as a product of $r$ irreducible factors. If, in particular, $r=1$, we say that the pair $(\phi,\alpha)$ is stable.

R. Jones and A. Levy proposed the following conjecture in 2017.

Conjecture: Let $K$ be a field and $\phi\in K(x)$ be a rational function of degree at least $2$. Let $\alpha\in K$ be a point that is not periodic for $\phi$.

1. If $K$ is a number field, then the pair $(\phi,\alpha)$ is eventually stable.
2. If $K$ is a function field and $\phi$ is not isotrivial, then $(\phi,\alpha)$ is eventually stable.

Several cases of the above conjecture have been proved by Jones and Levy, Hamblen et al., and DeMark et al.
