= Section conjecture =

Conjecture in algebraic geometry

In anabelian geometry, a branch of algebraic geometry, the section conjecture gives a conjectural description of the splittings of the group homomorphism $\pi_1(X)\to \operatorname{Gal}(k)$, where $X$ is a complete smooth curve of genus at least 2 over a field $k$ that is finitely generated over $\mathbb{Q}$, in terms of decomposition groups of rational points of $X$. The conjecture was introduced by Alexander Grothendieck (1997) in a 1983 letter to Gerd Faltings.
