= Artin–Verdier duality =

Theorem in number theory

In mathematics, Artin–Verdier duality is a duality theorem for constructible abelian sheaves over the spectrum of a ring of algebraic numbers, introduced by Michael Artin and Jean-Louis Verdier (1964), that generalizes Tate duality.

It shows that, as far as etale (or flat) cohomology is concerned, the ring of integers in a number field behaves like a 3-dimensional mathematical object.

== Statement ==
Let X be the spectrum of the ring of integers in a totally imaginary number field K, and F a constructible étale abelian sheaf on X. Then the Yoneda pairing

$$H^r(X,F)\times \operatorname{Ext}^{3-r}(F,\mathbb{G}_m)\to H^3(X,\mathbb{G}_m)=\Q/\Z$$

is a non-degenerate pairing of finite abelian groups, for every integer r.

Here, H^{r}(X,F) is the r-th étale cohomology group of the scheme X with values in F, and Ext^{r}(F,G) is the group of r-extensions of the étale sheaf G by the étale sheaf F in the category of étale abelian sheaves on X. Moreover, G_{m} denotes the étale sheaf of units in the structure sheaf of X.

Christopher Deninger (1986) proved Artin–Verdier duality for constructible, but not necessarily torsion sheaves. For such a sheaf F, the above pairing induces isomorphisms

$$\begin{align}
H^r(X, F)^* &\cong \operatorname{Ext}^{3-r}(F, \mathbb{G}_m) && r = 0, 1 \\
H^r(X, F) &\cong \operatorname{Ext}^{3-r}(F, \mathbb{G}_m)^* && r = 2, 3
\end{align}$$

where

$$(-)^* = \operatorname{Hom}(-, \Q /\Z).$$

== Finite flat group schemes ==
Let U be an open subscheme of the spectrum of the ring of integers in a number field K, and F a finite flat commutative group scheme over U. Then the cup product defines a non-degenerate pairing

$$H^r(U,F^D)\times H_c^{3-r}(U,F)\to H_c^3(U,{\mathbb G}_m)=\Q/\Z$$

of finite abelian groups, for all integers r.

Here F^{D} denotes the Cartier dual of F, which is another finite flat commutative group scheme over U. Moreover, $H^r(U,F)$ is the r-th flat cohomology group of the scheme U with values in the flat abelian sheaf F, and $H_c^r(U,F)$ is the r-th flat cohomology with compact supports of U with values in the flat abelian sheaf F.

The flat cohomology with compact supports is defined to give rise to a long exact sequence

$$\cdots\to H^r_c(U,F)\to H^r(U,F)\to \bigoplus\nolimits_{v\notin U} H^r(K_v,F)\to H^{r+1}_c(U,F) \to\cdots$$

The sum is taken over all places of K, which are not in U, including the archimedean ones. The local contribution H^{r}(K_{v}, F) is the Galois cohomology of the Henselization K_{v} of K at the place v, modified a la Tate:

$$H^r(K_v,F)=H^r_T(\mathrm{Gal}(K_v^s/K_v),F(K_v^s)).$$

Here $K_v^s$ is a separable closure of $K_v.$
