= Wolfgang Krull =

German mathematician (1899–1971)

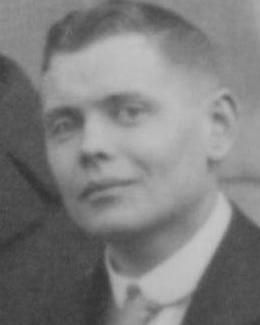
Wolfgang Krull, Göttingen 1920

Wolfgang Krull (26 August 1899 – 12 April 1971) was a German mathematician who made fundamental contributions to commutative algebra, introducing concepts that are now central to the subject.

Krull was born and went to school in Baden-Baden. He attended the Universities of Freiburg, Rostock and finally Göttingen from 1919–1921, where he earned his doctorate under Alfred Loewy. He worked as an instructor and professor at Freiburg, then spent a decade at the University of Erlangen. In 1939, Krull moved to become chair at the University of Bonn, where he remained for the rest of his life. Wolfgang Krull was a member of the Nazi Party.

His 35 doctoral students include Wilfried Brauer, Karl-Otto Stöhr and Jürgen Neukirch.

== See also ==
- Cohen structure theorem
- Jacobson ring
- Local ring
- Prime ideal
- Real algebraic geometry
- Regular local ring
- Valuation ring
- Krull dimension
- Krull ring
- Krull topology
- Krull–Azumaya theorem
- Krull–Schmidt category
- Krull–Schmidt theorem
- Krull's intersection theorem
- Krull's principal ideal theorem
- Krull's separation lemma
- Krull's theorem

== Publications ==
- Krull, Wolfgang (1935), Idealtheorie, Ergebnisse der Mathematik, Springer
- Krull, Wolfgang (1999), Ribenboim, Paulo (ed.), Gesammelte Abhandlungen/Collected papers. Vol. 1, 2 (in German), Berlin: Walter de Gruyter & Co., ISBN 978-3-11-012771-3, MR 1711477
