= Fiber functor =

Fiber functors in category theory, topology and algebraic geometry refer to several loosely related functors that generalise the functors taking a covering space $\pi\colon X\rightarrow S$ to the fiber $\pi^{-1}(s)$ over a point $s\in S$.

== Definition ==
A fiber functor (or fibre functor) is a loose concept which has multiple definitions depending on the formalism considered. One of the main initial motivations for fiber functors comes from Topos theory. Recall a topos is the category of sheaves over a site. If a site is just a single object, as with a point, then the topos of the point is equivalent to the category of sets, $\mathfrak{Set}$. If we have the topos of sheaves on a topological space $X$, denoted $\mathfrak{T}(X)$, then to give a point $a$ in $X$ is equivalent to defining adjoint functors

$a^*:\mathfrak{T}(X)\leftrightarrows \mathfrak{Set}:a_*$

The functor $a^*$ sends a sheaf $\mathfrak{F}$ on $X$ to its fiber over the point $a$; that is, its stalk.

=== From covering spaces ===
Consider the category of covering spaces over a topological space $X$, denoted $\mathfrak{Cov}(X)$. Then, from a point $x \in X$ there is a fiber functor

$\text{Fib}_x: \mathfrak{Cov}(X) \to \mathfrak{Set}$

sending a covering space $\pi:Y \to X$ to the fiber $\pi^{-1}(x)$. This functor has automorphisms coming from $\pi_1(X,x)$ since the fundamental group acts on covering spaces on a topological space $X$. In particular, it acts on the set $\pi^{-1}(x) \subset Y$. In fact, the only automorphisms of $\text{Fib}_x$ come from $\pi_1(X,x)$.

==== With étale topologies ====
There is an algebraic analogue of covering spaces coming from the étale topology on a connected scheme $S$. The underlying site consists of finite étale covers, which are finite flat surjective morphisms $X \to S$ such that the fiber over every geometric point $s \in S$ is the spectrum of a finite étale $\kappa(s)$-algebra. For a fixed geometric point $\overline{s}:\text{Spec}(\Omega) \to S$, consider the geometric fiber $X\times_S\text{Spec}(\Omega)$ and let $\text{Fib}_{\overline{s}}(X)$ be the underlying set of $\Omega$-points. Then,

$\text{Fib}_{\overline{s}}: \mathfrak{Fet}_S \to \mathfrak{Sets}$

is a fiber functor where $\mathfrak{Fet}_S$ is the topos from the finite étale topology on $S$. In fact, it is a theorem of Grothendieck that the automorphisms of $\text{Fib}_{\overline{s}}$ form a profinite group, denoted $\pi_1(S,\overline{s})$, and induce a continuous group action on these finite fiber sets, giving an equivalence between covers and the finite sets with such actions.

=== From Tannakian categories ===
Another class of fiber functors come from cohomological realizations of motives in algebraic geometry. For example, the De Rham cohomology functor $H_{dR}$ sends a motive $M(X)$ to its underlying de-Rham cohomology groups $H_{dR}^*(X)$.

== See also ==
- Topos
- Étale topology
- Motive (algebraic geometry)
- Anabelian geometry
