= Semistable reduction theorem =

Mathematical theory in the field of algebraic geometry

In algebraic geometry, semistable reduction theorems state that, given a proper flat morphism of schemes $X \to S$, there exists a morphism $S' \to S$ (called base change) such that $X \times_S S' \to S'$ is semistable (i.e., the singularities are mild in some sense). Precise formulations depend on the specific versions of the theorem. For example, if $S$ is the unit disk in $\mathbb{C}$, then "semistable" means that the special fiber is a divisor with normal crossings.

The fundamental semistable reduction theorem for Abelian varieties by Grothendieck shows that if $A$ is an Abelian variety over the fraction field $K$ of a discrete valuation ring $\mathcal{O}$, then there is a finite field extension $L/K$ such that $A_{(L)} = A \otimes_K L$ has semistable reduction over the integral closure $\mathcal{O}_L$ of $\mathcal{O}$ in $L$. Semistability here means more precisely that if $\mathcal{A}_L$ is the Néron model of $A_{(L)}$ over $\mathcal{O}_L,$ then the fibres $\mathcal{A}_{L,s}$ of $\mathcal{A}_L$ over the closed points $s\in S=\mathrm{Spec}(\mathcal{O}_L)$ (which are always a smooth algebraic groups) are extensions of Abelian varieties by tori. Here $S$ is the algebro-geometric analogue of "small" disc around the $s\in S$, and the condition of the theorem states essentially that $A$ can be thought of as a smooth family of Abelian varieties away from $s$; the conclusion then shows that after base change this "family" extends to the $s$ so that also the fibres over the $s$ are close to being Abelian varieties.

The important semistable reduction theorem for algebraic curves was first proved by Deligne and Mumford. The proof proceeds by showing that the curve has semistable reduction if and only if its Jacobian variety (which is an Abelian variety) has semistable reduction; one then applies the theorem for Abelian varieties above.
