= Riemann's existence theorem =

Theorem in complex analysis

In mathematics, specifically complex analysis, Riemann's existence theorem states that the category of compact Riemann surfaces is equivalent to the category of complex complete algebraic curves.

Sometimes, the theorem also refers to a generalization (a theorem of Grauert–Remmert), which says that the category of finite topological coverings of a complex algebraic variety is equivalent to the category of finite étale coverings of the variety.

== Original statement ==
Let $X$ be a compact Riemann surface, $p_1, \cdots, p_s$ distinct points in $X$ and $a_1, \cdots, a_s$ complex numbers. Then there is a meromorphic function $f$ on $X$ such that $f(p_i) = a_i$ for all $1\leq i\leq s$.

== Proof ==
For now, see SGA 1, Expose XII, Théorème 5.1., or SGA 4, Expose XI. 4.3.

== Consequences ==
By definition, if $X$ is a complex algebraic variety, the étale fundamental group of $X$ at a geometric point $x$ is the projective limit

$$\pi_1^{\textrm{et}}(X, x) = \varprojlim \operatorname{Aut}_X(Y)$$

over all finite Galois coverings $Y$ of $X$. By the existence theorem, we have

$$\operatorname{Aut}_X(Y) = \operatorname{Aut}_{X^{an}}(Y^{an})$$.

Hence, $\pi_1^{\textrm{et}}(X, x)$ is exactly the profinite completion of the usual topological fundamental group $\pi_1(X^{\textrm{an}}, x)$ of $X$ at $x$.

== See also ==
- Algebraic geometry and analytic geometry
