= Étale homotopy type =

Analogue of homotopy type for algebraic varieties

In mathematics, especially in algebraic geometry, the étale homotopy type is an analogue of the homotopy type of topological spaces for algebraic varieties.

Roughly speaking, for a variety or scheme X, the idea is to consider étale coverings $U \rightarrow X$ and to replace each connected component of U and the higher "intersections", i.e., fiber products, $U_n := U \times_X U \times_X \dots \times_X U$ (n+1 copies of U, $n \geq 0$) by a single point. This gives a simplicial set which captures some information related to X and the étale topology of it.

Slightly more precisely, it is in general necessary to work with étale hypercovers $(U_n)_{n \geq 0}$ instead of the above simplicial scheme determined by a usual étale cover. Taking finer and finer hypercoverings (which is technically accomplished by working with the pro-object in simplicial sets determined by taking all hypercoverings), the resulting object is the étale homotopy type of X. Similarly to classical topology, it is able to recover much of the usual data related to the étale topology, in particular the étale fundamental group of the scheme and the étale cohomology of locally constant étale sheaves.

== Example ==
For $Spec(k)$, morally taking $Spec(\bar{k})$ the simplicial complex would be the one computing $BGal(k)$.

== Modern perspective ==
The pro-etale site gives a refinement and generates a homotopical object in simplicial profinite sets. This has a forgetful functor to the homotopy category of profinite simplicial sets.
