= Belyi's theorem =

Connects non-singular algebraic curves with compact Riemann surfaces

In mathematics, Belyi's theorem on algebraic curves states that any non-singular algebraic curve C, defined by algebraic number coefficients, represents a compact Riemann surface which is a ramified covering of the Riemann sphere, ramified at three points only.

This is a result of G. V. Belyi from 1979. At the time it was considered surprising, and it spurred Grothendieck to develop his theory of dessins d'enfant, which describes non-singular algebraic curves over the algebraic numbers using combinatorial data.

== Quotients of the upper half-plane ==
It follows that the Riemann surface in question can be taken to be the quotient

$$H / \Gamma$$

(where $H$ is the upper half-plane and $\Gamma$ is a subgroup of finite index in the modular group) compactified by cusps. Since the modular group has non-congruence subgroups, it is not the conclusion that any such curve is a modular curve.

== Belyi functions ==
A Belyi function is a holomorphic map from a compact Riemann surface $S$ to the complex projective line $\mathbb{P}^1(\mathbb{C})$ ramified only over three points, which after a Möbius transformation may be taken to be $\{0, 1, \infty\}$. Belyi functions may be described combinatorially by dessins d'enfants.

Belyi functions and dessins d'enfants – but not Belyi's theorem – date at least to the work of Felix Klein; he used them in his article (Klein 1879) to study an 11-fold cover of the complex projective line with monodromy group $PSL(2,11)$.

== Applications ==
Belyi's theorem is an existence theorem for Belyi functions, and has subsequently been much used in the inverse Galois problem.
