= Severi variety (Hilbert scheme) =

Algebraic variety in a Hilbert scheme

In mathematics, a Severi variety is an algebraic variety in a Hilbert scheme that parametrizes curves in projective space with given degree and geometric genus and at most node singularities. Its dimension is 3d + g − 1.

It is a theorem that Severi varieties are algebraic varieties, i.e. irreducible.
