= Absolute Galois group =

Galois group of the separable closure

The absolute Galois group of the real numbers is a cyclic group of order 2 generated by complex conjugation, since $\C$ is the separable closure of $\R$ and $[\C:\R]=2$.

In mathematics, particularly in anabelian geometry and p-adic geometry, the absolute Galois group $G_K$ of a field $K$ is the Galois group of $K^\textrm{sep}$ over $K$, where $K^\textrm{sep}$ is a separable closure of $K$. Alternatively, it is the group of all automorphisms of the algebraic closure of $K$ that fix $K$. The absolute Galois group is well-defined up to inner automorphism. It is a profinite group.

When $K$ is a perfect field, $K^\textrm{sep}$ is the same as an algebraic closure $K^\textrm{alg}$ of $K$. Notably, this holds when $K$ has characteristic zero or is finite.

== Examples ==
- The absolute Galois group of an algebraically closed field is trivial.
- The absolute Galois group of the real numbers is a cyclic group of two elements (complex conjugation and the identity map), since $\C$ is the separable closure of $\R$, and its degree over $\R$ is $[\C:\R]=2$.
- The absolute Galois group of a finite field $K$ is isomorphic to the group of profinite integers

$\hat{\mathbb{Z}} = \varprojlim \mathbb{Z}/n\mathbb{Z}.$

The Frobenius automorphism is a canonical (topological) generator of $G_K$. If $K$ has $q$ elements, the map is given by $x\mapsto x^q$ for all $x$ in $K^\textrm{alg}$.

- The absolute Galois group of the field of rational functions with complex coefficients is free (as a profinite group). This result is due to Adrien Douady and has its origins in Riemann's existence theorem.
- More generally, let $C$ be an algebraically closed field and $x$ an indeterminate. Then the absolute Galois group of $C(x)$ is free of rank equal to the cardinality of $C$. This result is due to David Harbater and Florian Pop, and was also proved later by Dan Haran and Moshe Jarden using algebraic methods.
- Let $K$ be a finite extension of the p-adic numbers $\Q_p$. For $p\neq 2$, its absolute Galois group is generated by $[K:\Q_p]+3$ elements and has an explicit description by generators and relations. This is a result of Uwe Jannsen and Kay Wingberg. Some results are known in the case $p=2$, but the structure for $\Q_2$ is not known.
- Another case in which the absolute Galois group has been determined is for the largest totally real subfield of the field of algebraic numbers.

== Problems ==
- No direct description is known for the absolute Galois group of the rational numbers. In this case, it follows from Belyi's theorem that the absolute Galois group has a faithful action on the dessins d'enfants of Grothendieck (maps on surfaces), enabling us to "see" the Galois theory of algebraic number fields. It is one of the goals of anabelian geometry to solve this problem
- Let $K$ be the maximal abelian extension of the rational numbers. Then Shafarevich's conjecture asserts that the absolute Galois group of $K$ is a free profinite group.
- An interesting problem is to settle Ján Mináč and Nguyên Duy Tân's conjecture about vanishing of $n$-Massey products for $n \geq 3$.

== Some general results ==
- The Neukirch–Uchida theorem asserts that every isomorphism of the absolute Galois groups of algebraic number fields arises from a field automorphism. In particular, two absolute Galois groups of number fields are isomorphic if and only if the base fields are isomorphic.
- Every profinite group occurs as a Galois group of some Galois extension, but not every profinite group occurs as an absolute Galois group. For example, the Artin–Schreier theorem asserts that if an absolute Galois group is finite, then it has order 1 or 2.
- Every projective profinite group can be realized as an absolute Galois group of a pseudo algebraically closed field. This result is due to Alexander Lubotzky and Lou van den Dries.

== Uses in the geometrization of the local Langlands correspondence ==
In their 2022 paper on the geometrization of the local Langlands correspondence, Laurent Fargues and Peter Scholze looked to recover information about a local field E via its absolute Galois group, which is isomorphic to the étale fundamental group of Spec(E). This result was calculated while trying to evaluate the Weil group (which itself is a variant of the absolute Galois group) of E. This result arrives from the idea of the automorphism group G(E) of the trivial G-torsor over Spec(E); thus, G(E) relates to information over Spec(E), which is an anabelian question.
