= Étale fundamental group =

Topological concept in algebraic geometry

The étale or algebraic fundamental group is an analogue in algebraic geometry, for schemes, of the usual fundamental group of topological spaces.

== Topological analogue/informal discussion ==
In algebraic topology, the fundamental group $\pi_1(X,x)$ of a pointed topological space $(X, x)$ is defined as the group of homotopy classes of loops based at $x$. This definition works well for spaces such as real and complex manifolds, but gives undesirable results for an algebraic variety with the Zariski topology.

In the classification of covering spaces, it is shown that the fundamental group is exactly the group of deck transformations of the universal covering space. This is more promising: finite étale morphisms of algebraic varieties are the appropriate analogue of covering spaces of topological spaces. Unfortunately, an algebraic variety $X$ often fails to have a "universal cover" that is finite over $X$, so one must consider the entire category of finite étale coverings of $X$. One can then define the étale fundamental group as an inverse limit of finite automorphism groups.

== Formal definition ==
Let $X$ be a connected and locally noetherian scheme, let $x$ be a geometric point of $X,$ and let $C$ be the category of pairs $(Y,f)$ such that $f \colon Y \to X$ is a finite étale morphism from a scheme $Y.$ Morphisms $(Y,f)\to (Y',f')$ in this category are morphisms $Y\to Y'$ as schemes over $X.$ This category has a natural functor to the category of sets, namely the functor:

$$F(Y) = \operatorname{Hom}_X(x, Y);$$

geometrically this is the fiber of $Y \to X$ over $x,$ and abstractly it is the Yoneda functor represented by $x$ in the category of schemes over $X$. The functor $F$ is typically not representable in $C$; however, it is pro-representable in $C$, in fact by Galois covers of $X$. This means that we have a projective system $\{X_j \to X_i \mid i < j \in I\}$ in $C$, indexed by a directed set $I,$ where the $X_i$ are Galois covers of $X$, i.e., finite étale schemes over $X$ such that $\#\operatorname{Aut}_X(X_i) = \operatorname{deg}(X_i/X)$. It also means that we have given an isomorphism of functors:

$$F(Y) = \varinjlim_{i \in I} \operatorname{Hom}_C(X_i, Y).$$

In particular, we have a marked point $P\in \varprojlim_{i \in I} F(X_i)$ of the projective system.

For two such $X_i, X_j$ the map $X_j \to X_i$ induces a group homomorphism $\operatorname{Aut}_X(X_j) \to \operatorname{Aut}_X(X_i)$ which produces a projective system of automorphism groups from the projective system $\{X_i\}$. We then make the following definition: the étale fundamental group $\pi_1(X,x)$ of $X$ at $x$ is the inverse limit:

$$\pi_1(X,x) = \varprojlim_{i \in I} {\operatorname{Aut}}_X(X_i),$$

with the inverse limit topology.

The functor $F$ is now a functor from $C$ to the category of finite and continuous $\pi_1(X,x)$-sets and establishes an equivalence of categories between $C$ and the category of finite and continuous $\pi_1(X,x)$-sets.

== Examples and theorems ==
The most basic example of is $\pi_1(\operatorname{Spec} k)$, the étale fundamental group of a field $k$. Essentially by definition, the fundamental group of $k$ can be shown to be isomorphic to the absolute Galois group $\operatorname{Gal}(k^{sep} / k)$. More precisely, the choice of a geometric point of $\operatorname{Spec}(k)$ is equivalent to giving a separably closed extension field $K$, and the étale fundamental group with respect to that base point identifies with the Galois group $\operatorname{Gal}(K/k)$. This interpretation of the Galois group is known as Grothendieck's Galois theory.

More generally, for any geometrically connected variety $X$ over a field $k$ (i.e., $X$ is such that $X^{sep} := X \times_k k^{sep}$ is connected) there is an exact sequence of profinite groups:

$$1 \to \pi_1(X^{sep}, \overline{x}) \to \pi_1(X, \overline{x}) \to \operatorname{Gal}(k^{sep}/k) \to 1.$$

=== Schemes over a field of characteristic zero ===
For a scheme $X$ that is of finite type over $\mathbb{C}$, the complex numbers, there is a close relation between the étale fundamental group of $X$ and the usual, topological, fundamental group of $X(\mathbb{C})$, the complex analytic space attached to $X$. The algebraic fundamental group, as it is typically called in this case, is the profinite completion of $\pi_1(X)$. This is a consequence of the Riemann existence theorem, which says that all finite étale coverings of $X(\mathbb{C})$ stem from ones of $X$. In particular, as the fundamental group of smooth curves over $\mathbb{C}$ (i.e., open Riemann surfaces) is well understood; this determines the algebraic fundamental group. More generally, the fundamental group of a proper scheme over any algebraically closed field of characteristic zero is known, because an extension of algebraically closed fields induces isomorphic fundamental groups.

=== Schemes over a field of positive characteristic and the tame fundamental group ===
For an algebraically closed field $k$ of positive characteristic, the results are different, since Artin–Schreier coverings exist in this situation. For example, the fundamental group of the affine line $\mathbf A^1_k$ is not topologically finitely generated. The tame fundamental group of some scheme U is a quotient of the usual fundamental group of $U$ which takes into account only covers that are tamely ramified along $D$, where $X$ is some compactification and $D$ is the complement of $U$ in $X$. For example, the tame fundamental group of the affine line is zero.

=== Affine schemes over a field of characteristic p ===
It turns out that every affine scheme $X \subset \mathbf{A}^n_k$ is a $K(\pi,1)$-space, in the sense that the étale homotopy type of $X$ is entirely determined by its étale homotopy group. Note $\pi = \pi_1^{et}(X,\overline{x})$ where $\overline{x}$ is a geometric point.

=== Further topics ===
From a category-theoretic point of view, the fundamental group is a functor:

{Pointed algebraic varieties} → {Profinite groups}.

The inverse Galois problem asks what groups can arise as fundamental groups (or Galois groups of field extensions). Anabelian geometry, for example Grothendieck's section conjecture, seeks to identify classes of varieties which are determined by their fundamental groups.

Friedlander (1982) studies higher étale homotopy groups by means of the étale homotopy type of a scheme.

== The pro-étale fundamental group ==
Bhatt & Scholze (2015, §7) have introduced a variant of the étale fundamental group called the pro-étale fundamental group. It is constructed by considering, instead of finite étale covers, maps which are both étale and satisfy the valuative criterion of properness. For geometrically unibranch schemes (e.g., normal schemes), the two approaches agree, but in general the pro-étale fundamental group is a finer invariant: its profinite completion is the étale fundamental group.

== See also ==
- étale morphism
- Fundamental group scheme
