= Profinite group =

Topological group that is in a certain sense assembled from a system of finite groups

In mathematics, a profinite group is a topological group that is in a certain sense assembled from a system of finite groups.

The idea of using a profinite group is to provide a "uniform", or "synoptic", view of an entire system of finite groups. Properties of the profinite group are generally speaking uniform properties of the system. For example, the profinite group is finitely generated (as a topological group) if and only if there exists $d\in\N$ such that every group in the system can be generated by $d$ elements. Many theorems about finite groups can be readily generalised to profinite groups; examples are Lagrange's theorem and the Sylow theorems.

To construct a profinite group one needs a system of finite groups and group homomorphisms between them. Without loss of generality, these homomorphisms can be assumed to be surjective, in which case the finite groups will appear as quotient groups of the resulting profinite group; in a sense, these quotients approximate the profinite group.

Important examples of profinite groups are the additive groups of $p$-adic integers and the Galois groups of infinite-degree field extensions.

Every profinite group is compact and totally disconnected. A non-compact generalization of the concept is that of locally profinite groups. Even more general are the totally disconnected groups.

== Definition ==
Profinite groups can be defined in either of two equivalent ways.

=== First definition (constructive) ===
A profinite group is a topological group that is isomorphic to the inverse limit of an inverse system of discrete finite groups. In this context, an inverse system consists of a directed set $(I, \leq),$ an indexed family of finite groups $\{G_i: i \in I\},$ each having the discrete topology, and a family of homomorphisms $\{f^j_i : G_j \to G_i \mid i, j \in I, i \leq j\}$ such that $f_i^i$ is the identity map on $G_i$ and the collection satisfies the composition property $f^j_i \circ f^k_j = f^k_i$ whenever $i\leq j\leq k.$ The inverse limit is the set:
$$\varprojlim G_i = \left\{(g_i)_{i \in I} \in {\textstyle\prod\limits_{i \in I}} G_i : f^j_i (g_j) = g_i \text{ for all } i\leq j\right\}$$
equipped with the relative product topology.

One can also define the inverse limit in terms of a universal property. In categorical terms, this is a special case of a cofiltered limit construction.

=== Second definition ===
A profinite group is a Hausdorff, compact and totally disconnected topological group: that is, a topological group that is also a Stone space.

=== Profinite completion ===
Given an arbitrary group $G$, there is a related profinite group $\widehat{G},$ the profinite completion of $G$. It is defined as the inverse limit of the groups $G/N$, where $N$ runs through the normal subgroups in $G$ of finite index (these normal subgroups are partially ordered by inclusion, which translates into an inverse system of natural homomorphisms between the quotients).

There is a natural homomorphism $\eta : G \to \widehat{G}$, and the image of $G$ under this homomorphism is dense in $\widehat{G}$. The homomorphism $\eta$ is injective if and only if the group $G$ is residually finite (i.e., $\bigcap N = 1$, where the intersection runs through all normal subgroups $N$ of finite index).

The homomorphism $\eta$ is characterized by the following universal property: given any profinite group $H$ and any continuous group homomorphism $f : G \rightarrow H$ where $G$ is given the smallest topology compatible with group operations in which its normal subgroups of finite index are open, there exists a unique continuous group homomorphism $g : \widehat{G} \rightarrow H$ with $f = g \eta$.

=== Equivalence ===
Any group constructed by the first definition satisfies the axioms in the second definition.

Conversely, any group $G$ satisfying the axioms in the second definition can be constructed as an inverse limit according to the first definition using the inverse limit $\varprojlim G/N$ where $N$ ranges through the open normal subgroups of $G$ ordered by (reverse) inclusion. If $G$ is topologically finitely generated then it is in addition equal to its own profinite completion.

=== Surjective systems ===
In practice, the inverse system of finite groups is almost always surjective, meaning that all its maps are surjective. Without loss of generality, it suffices to consider only surjective systems since given any inverse system, it is possible to first construct its profinite group $G,$ and then reconstruct it as its own profinite completion.

== Examples ==
- Finite groups are profinite, if given the discrete topology.
- The group of $p$-adic integers $\Z_p$ under addition is profinite (in fact procyclic). It is the inverse limit of the finite groups $\Z/p^n\Z$ where $n$ ranges over all natural numbers and the natural maps $\Z/p^n\Z \to \Z/p^m\Z$ for $n \ge m.$ The topology on this profinite group is the same as the topology arising from the $p$-adic valuation on $\Z_p.$
- The group of profinite integers $\widehat{\Z}$ is the profinite completion of $\Z.$ In detail, it is the inverse limit of the finite groups $\Z/n\Z$ where $n = 1,2,3,\dots$ with the modulo maps $\Z/n\Z \to \Z/m\Z$ for $m\,|\,n.$ This group is the product of all the groups $\Z_p,$ and it is the absolute Galois group of any finite field.
- The Galois theory of field extensions of infinite degree gives rise naturally to Galois groups that are profinite. Specifically, if $L / K$ is a Galois extension, consider the group $G = \operatorname{Gal}(L / K)$ consisting of all field automorphisms of $L$ that keep all elements of $K$ fixed. This group is the inverse limit of the finite groups $\operatorname{Gal}(F / K),$ where $F$ ranges over all intermediate fields such that $F / K$ is a finite Galois extension. For the limit process, the restriction homomorphisms $\operatorname{Gal}(F_1 / K) \to \operatorname{Gal}(F_2 / K)$ are used, where $F_2 \subseteq F_1.$ The topology obtained on $\operatorname{Gal}(L / K)$ is known as the Krull topology after Wolfgang Krull. Waterhouse (1974) showed that every profinite group is isomorphic to one arising from the Galois theory of some field $K,$ but one cannot (yet) control which field $K$ will be in this case. In fact, for many fields $K$ one does not know in general precisely which finite groups occur as Galois groups over $K.$ This is the inverse Galois problem for a field $K.$ (For some fields $K$ the inverse Galois problem is settled, such as the field of rational functions in one variable over the complex numbers.) Not every profinite group occurs as an absolute Galois group of a field.
- The étale fundamental groups considered in algebraic geometry are also profinite groups, roughly speaking because the algebra can only 'see' finite coverings of an algebraic variety. The fundamental groups of algebraic topology, however, are in general not profinite: for any prescribed group, there is a 2-dimensional CW complex whose fundamental group equals it.
- The automorphism group of a locally finite rooted tree is profinite.

== Properties and facts ==
- Every product of (arbitrarily many) profinite groups is profinite; the topology arising from the profiniteness agrees with the product topology. The inverse limit of an inverse system of profinite groups with continuous transition maps is profinite and the inverse limit functor is exact on the category of profinite groups. Further, being profinite is an extension property.
- Every closed subgroup of a profinite group is itself profinite; the topology arising from the profiniteness agrees with the subspace topology. If $N$ is a closed normal subgroup of a profinite group $G,$ then the factor group $G / N$ is profinite; the topology arising from the profiniteness agrees with the quotient topology.
- Since every profinite group $G$ is compact Hausdorff, there exists a Haar measure on $G,$ which allows us to measure the "size" of subsets of $G,$ compute certain probabilities, and integrate functions on $G.$
- A subgroup of a profinite group is open if and only if it is closed and has finite index.
- According to a theorem of Nikolay Nikolov and Dan Segal, in any topologically finitely generated profinite group (that is, a profinite group that has a dense finitely generated subgroup) the subgroups of finite index are open. This generalizes an earlier analogous result of Jean-Pierre Serre for topologically finitely generated pro-$p$ groups. The proof uses the classification of finite simple groups.
- As an easy corollary of the Nikolov–Segal result above, any surjective discrete group homomorphism $\varphi : G \to H$ between profinite groups $G$ and $H$ is continuous as long as $G$ is topologically finitely generated. Indeed, any open subgroup of $H$ is of finite index, so its preimage in $G$ is also of finite index, and hence it must be open.
- Suppose $G$ and $H$ are topologically finitely generated profinite groups that are isomorphic as discrete groups by an isomorphism $\iota.$ Then $\iota$ is bijective and continuous by the above result. Furthermore, $\iota^{-1}$ is also continuous, so $\iota$ is a homeomorphism. Therefore the topology on a topologically finitely generated profinite group is uniquely determined by its algebraic structure.

== Ind-finite groups ==
There is a notion of ind-finite group, which is the conceptual dual to profinite groups; i.e. a group $G$ is ind-finite if it is the direct limit of an inductive system of finite groups. (In particular, it is an ind-group.) The usual terminology is different: a group $G$ is called locally finite if every finitely generated subgroup is finite. This is equivalent, in fact, to being 'ind-finite'.

By applying Pontryagin duality, one can see that abelian profinite groups are in duality with locally finite discrete abelian groups. The latter are just the abelian torsion groups.

== Projective profinite groups ==
A profinite group is projective if it has the lifting property for every extension. This is equivalent to saying that $G$ is projective if for every surjective morphism from a profinite $H \to G$ there is a section $G \to H.$

Projectivity for a profinite group $G$ is equivalent to either of the two properties:

- the cohomological dimension $\operatorname{cd}(G) \leq 1;$
- for every prime $p$ the Sylow $p$-subgroups of $G$ are free pro-$p$-groups.

Every projective profinite group can be realized as an absolute Galois group of a pseudo algebraically closed field. This result is due to Alexander Lubotzky and Lou van den Dries.

== Procyclic group ==
A profinite group $G$ is procyclic if it is topologically generated by a single element $\sigma;$ that is, if $G = \overline{\langle \sigma \rangle},$ the closure of the subgroup $\langle \sigma \rangle = \left\{\sigma^n: n \in \Z\right\}.$

A topological group $G$ is procyclic if and only if $G \cong {\textstyle\prod\limits_{p\in S}} G_p$ where $p$ ranges over some set of prime numbers $S$ and $G_p$ is isomorphic to either $\Z_p$ or $\Z/p^n \Z, n \in \N.$

== See also ==
- Hausdorff completion
- Locally cyclic group
- Pro-p group
- Profinite integer – Number-theoretic concept
- Residual property (mathematics)
- Residually finite group – Type of mathematical group
