= List of things named after Alexander Grothendieck =

The mathematician Alexander Grothendieck (1928–2014) is the eponym of many things.

== Mathematics ==
- Ax–Grothendieck theorem
- Birkhoff–Grothendieck theorem
- Brieskorn–Grothendieck resolution
- Dolbeault-Grothendieck lemma
- Grothendieck's axioms
- Grothendieck category
- Grothendieck's comparison theorem
- Grothendieck's connectedness theorem
- Grothendieck connection
- Grothendieck construction
- Grothendieck duality
- Grothendieck existence theorem
- Grothendieck fibration
- Grothendieck's Galois theory
- Grothendieck group
- Grothendieck's homotopy hypothesis
- Grothendieck inequality or Grothendieck constant
- Grothendieck–Katz p-curvature conjecture
- Grothendieck local duality
- Grothendieck's monodromy theorem
- Grothendieck's mysterious functor
- Grothendieck–Ogg–Shafarevich formula
- Grothendieck period conjecture
- Grothendieck prime
- Grothendieck ring
- Grothendieck's relative point of view
- Grothendieck's theorem
- Grothendieck's theorem (Fredholm kernel)
- Grothendieck–Riemann–Roch theorem
- Grothendieck's Séminaire de géométrie algébrique
- Grothendieck's six operations
- Grothendieck's vanishing theorem
- Grothendieck space
- Grothendieck spectral sequence
- Grothendieck–Springer resolution
- Grothendieck–Teichmüller group
- Grothendieck–Teichmüller theory
- Grothendieck-Witt ring
- Grothendieck trace formula
- Grothendieck trace theorem
- Grothendieck pretopology
- Grothendieck topoi
- Grothendieck topology
- Grothendieck universe
- Institut Montpelliérain Alexander Grothendieck
- Serre–Grothendieck–Verdier duality
- Tarski–Grothendieck set theory
- Tutte–Grothendieck invariant
