= Colin McLarty =

American logician (born 1951)

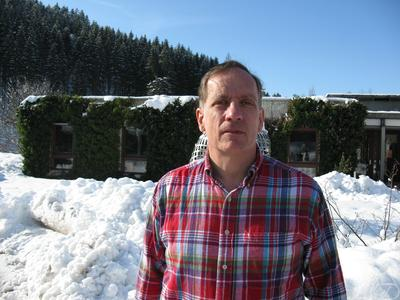
Colin McLarty

Colin McLarty (born July 12, 1951) is an American logician whose publications have ranged widely in philosophy and the foundations of mathematics, as well as in the history of science and of mathematics.

== Research ==
=== Category theory ===
He has written papers about Saunders Mac Lane, one of the founders of category theory.

McLarty's Elementary Categories and Elementary Toposes describes category theory and topos theory at an elementary level.

McLarty worked on establishing that Fermat's Last Theorem can be proven in a setting with much weaker assumptions than the ones used in Wiles's proof of Fermat's Last Theorem, which makes use of involved category theoretical constructions.

=== History of Mathematics ===
He is a member of the Grothendieck Circle, which provides on-line and open access to many writings about the mathematician Alexandre Grothendieck, who revolutionized Banach-space theory and algebraic geometry and whose life has fascinated many biographers and mathematical scientists.

McLarty has also written about the German algebraist Emmy Noether and her involvement with German political history.

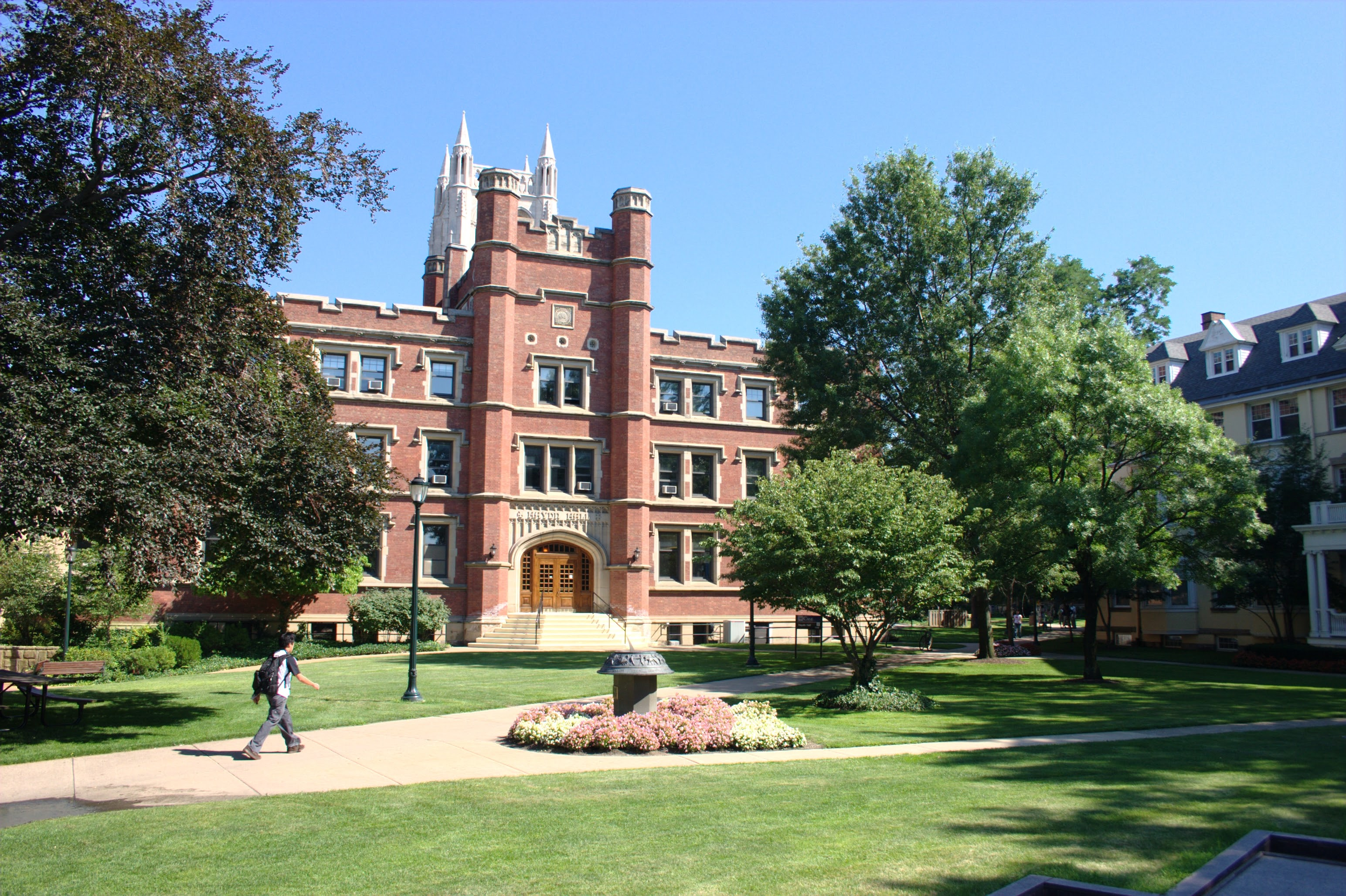
Case Western Reserve University

== Positions ==
At Case Western Reserve University (CWRU), Colin McLarty is the Truman P. Handy Professor of Philosophy and the current Chair of the Philosophy Department.

At CWRU, he is also a professor of mathematics.

== Bibliography ==
- McLarty, Colin (1992). Elementary Categories, Elementary Toposes. Oxford: Oxford University Press. ISBN 0-19-853392-6.
- Colin McLarty, The Uses and Abuses of the History of Topos Theory, Br. J. Philos. Sci, 41 (1990) p 355. doi:10.1093/bjps/41.3.351
- Colin McLarty, 'Emmy Noether’s ‘Set Theoretic’ Topology: From Dedekind to the rise of functors' in The Architecture of Modern Mathematics: Essays in history and philosophy (edited by Jeremy Gray and José Ferreirós), Oxford University Press (2006) p. 187–208.
- McLarty, Colin, 2005, "Saunders Mac Lane (1909–2005): His Mathematical Life and Philosophical Works," Philosophia Mathematica 13: 237–51. With selected bibliography emphasizing Mac Lane's philosophical writings.
- --------, 2007, "The Last Mathematician from Hilbert's Göttingen: Saunders Mac Lane as Philosopher of Mathematics", British Journal for the Philosophy of Science 58(1): 77–112.
- McLarty, Colin (2020), "The large structures of Grothendieck founded on finite-order arithmetic", The Review of Symbolic Logic, 13 (2): 296–325, arXiv:1102.1773, doi:10.1017/s1755020319000340, MR 4092251, Zbl 1484.03106

== See also ==
- "Abstract nonsense", a (usually ironic) term for category theory and category-theoretic arguments in homological algebra
- "Generalized abstract nonsense", an ironic and affectionate term for topos theory
- Other topos theorists (besides Saunders Mac Lane):
  - Martin Hyland
  - Peter Johnstone
  - William Lawvere
