= Nonsense (disambiguation) =

Nonsense is an utterance or written text that does not in fact carry any identifiable meaning.

Nonsense may also mean:

- Abstract nonsense, a term used by mathematicians to describe certain kinds of arguments and concepts in category theory
- Nonsense mutation, a term in genetics for a point mutation in a sequence of DNA that results in a premature stop codon
- Nonsense verse
- "Nonsense", a song by Madeon featuring Mark Foster, from the album Adventure
- "Nonsense", a book by Davide Roccamo
- "Nonsense" (song), a song by Sabrina Carpenter from the album Emails I Can't Send
- Nonsense (film), a 2016 film

== See also ==
- Fashionable Nonsense, a 1997 book by physicists Alan Sokal and Jean Bricmont
- Non-science
