= S. D. Chrostowska =

American novelist

S. D. Chrostowska is an American-Canadian writer and intellectual historian of modern critical thought. She holds a professorship in 20th century continental thought at York University in Canada.

== Biography and research ==
Sylwia Dominika Chrostowska, born to Polish parents and raised in Poland at the end of the Cold War, completed her PhD at the University of Toronto at the Centre for Comparative Literature under the supervision of historian Brian Stock. In 2014-2016 she was an Alexander von Humboldt Foundation fellow based at Humboldt University in Berlin.

Chrostowska's academic work is principally in the history of social and literary criticism (18th-20th century Europe). She writes mainly on Frankfurt School Critical Theory and on the critical dimension of utopianism and nostalgia. Her first book, Literature on Trial (2012), examined the rise of modern literary criticism in connection with the development of literature as a separate domain.

Chrostowska also writes cultural criticism spanning academic and nonacademic genres. Matches (2015), her wide-ranging collection of philosophical, critical, and literary fragments, was anthologized in Short Circuits: Aphorisms, Fragments, and Literary Anomalies (Schaffer Press, 2018). In 2018, Noxious Sector Press released Something Other than Lifedeath, a book of articles focusing on her work and edited by David Cechetto. She is a member of the Paris Surrealist Group and coedits the French-language review Alcheringa: Le surréalisme aujourd’hui.

Utopia in the Age of Survival is Chrostowska’s second scholarly book and a pointed intervention into left-wing debates about utopianism, including the theory of utopia, utopian experiments, and practices that she describes as "utopianizing" in their motivation or intent. She draws especially on the writings of French Surrealism, the Situationist International, and Survivre...et vivre to excavate the utopian energies of May '68 as they wrestled with the contradiction between accelerating economic development and life being generally reduced to survival, including through rampant consumerism. "Survival" is arguably the key concept in the book for working out the conditions, both material and psychological, for a "utopian politics." A large part of the discussion centers around the meaning of the term utopia, our negative and positive attitudes toward it, and ways to pursue utopia in light of the multiple crises facing today's societies. Chrostowska argues that we should rehabilitate the idea of utopia at a time when our reality increasingly resembles dystopia. She co-curated, with Joël Gayraud and Guy Girard, "Marvelous Utopia / Merveilleuse utopie", the 19th International Surrealist Exhibition at Saint-Cirq-Lapopie.

== Fiction ==
Chrostowska's epistolary novel Permission is composed of anonymous messages sent to a well-known filmmaker and includes black and white images. Quill & Quire called it "one of the most intellectually bracing, technically fascinating Canadian-authored novels" of 2013.

Her second novel, The Eyelid, is a critical dystopia set in near-future Paris, the capital of the world state of Greater America, and tells the story of two travelers through other people's dreams on a quest to save humanity from total insomniac dreamlessness. The book was the Editor's Choice at Quill & Quire, which praised its rare ambition and its dramatisation of the individual mind's subversive ability "to dream itself into a better existence." The Toronto Star's Alex Good chose it as one of the four best new science-fiction titles. According to German Sierra at Full Stop, the novella "might well become an instant cult book until it makes its way to a much deserved place at the top of any list of utopian-dystopian fiction masterworks." Its unique blend of narrative and social critique stages a dialectical confrontation, typical of the novel of ideas, between dystopian and utopian currents in contemporary capitalist societies.

== Books ==
- Utopia in the Age of Survival: Between Myth and Politics (Stanford: Stanford University Press, 2021)
- A Cage for Every Child (Seattle: Sublunary, 2021)
- The Eyelid (Toronto: Coach House Books, 2020)
- Matches: A Light Book, 2nd expanded edition, foreword by Alexander Kluge (Punctum Books, 2019)
- Literature on Trial: The Emergence of Critical Discourse in Germany, Poland, and Russia, 1700-1800 (Toronto: University of Toronto Press, 2012)
- Permission: A Novel (Urbana-Champaign, IL: Dalkey Archive Press, 2013)
- Matches: A Light Book (Brooklyn, NY: punctum books, 2015)
- Political Uses of Utopia: New Marxist, Anarchist, and Radical Democratic Perspectives, coedited with James D. Ingram (New York, NY: Columbia University Press, 2017)

In French

- Feux croisés: Propos sur l'histoire de la survie. Préfacé par Alexander Kluge. Traduit par Joël Gayraud (Paris, Klincksieck, 2019)
