= Luc Illusie =

French mathematician

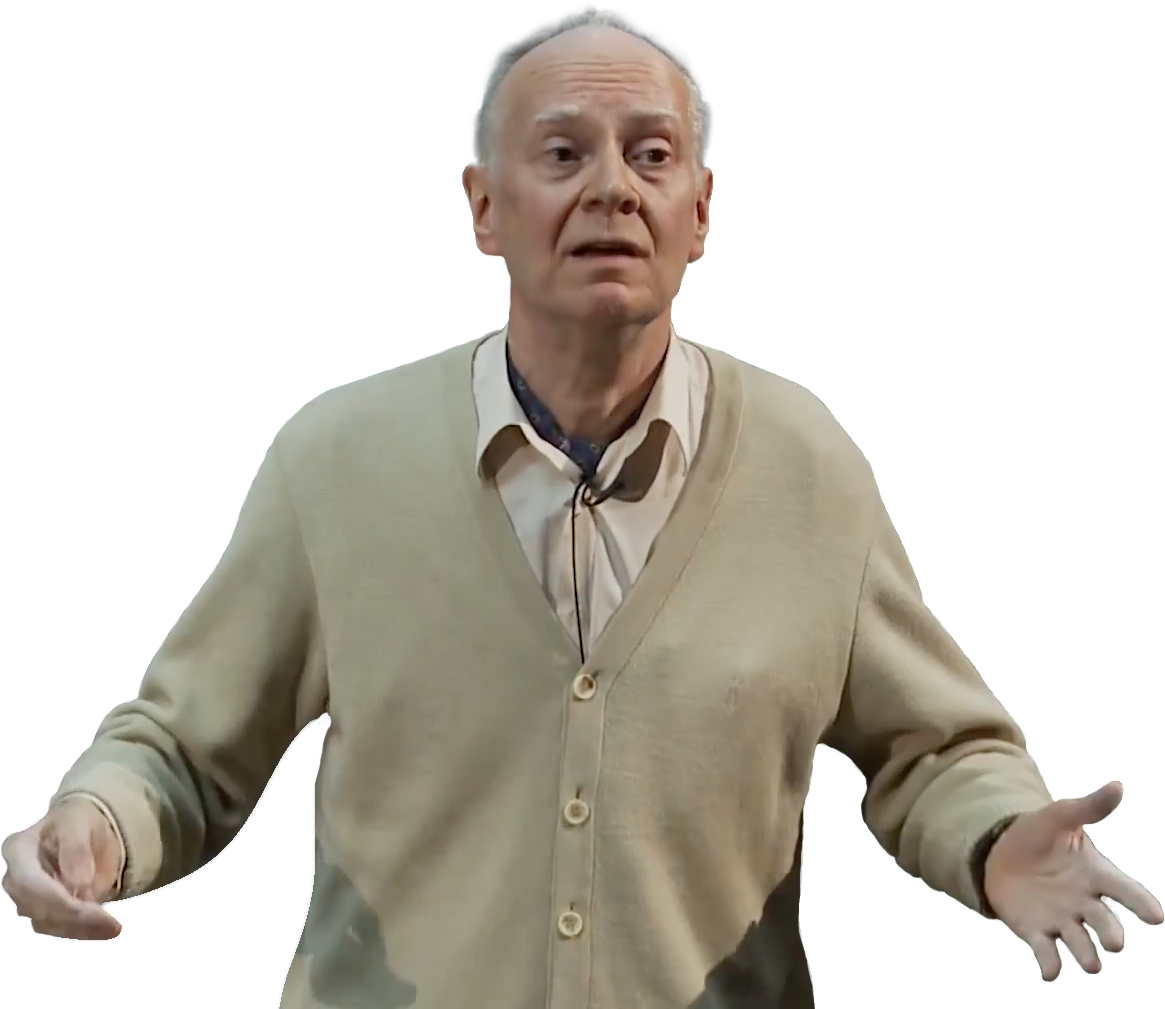
- Illusie in September 2014, while lecturing at the Institut des Hautes Études Scientifiques, Bures-sur-Yvette, France.
- Born: 1940 (age 85–86)
- Awards: Émile Picard Medal (2012)
- Scientific career
- Fields: Mathematics
- Institutions: University of Paris-Sud
- Doctoral advisor: Alexander Grothendieck
- Doctoral students: Gérard Laumon

Luc Illusie (French: [ilyzi]; born 1940) is a French mathematician, specializing in algebraic geometry. His most important work concerns the theory of the cotangent complex and deformations, crystalline cohomology and the De Rham–Witt complex, and logarithmic geometry. In 2012, he was awarded the Émile Picard Medal of the French Academy of Sciences.

== Biography ==
Luc Illusie entered the École Normale Supérieure in 1959. At first a student of the mathematician Henri Cartan, he participated in the Cartan–Schwartz seminar of 1963–1964. In 1964, following Cartan's advice, he began to work with Alexandre Grothendieck, collaborating with him on two volumes of the latter's Séminaire de Géométrie Algébrique du Bois Marie. In 1970, Illusie introduced the concept of the cotangent complex.

A researcher in the Centre national de la recherche scientifique from 1964 to 1976, Illusie then became a professor at the University of Paris-Sud, retiring as emeritus professor in 2005. Between 1984 and 1995, he was the director of the arithmetic and algebraic geometry group in the department of mathematics of that university. Torsten Ekedahl and Gérard Laumon are among his students.

== Thesis ==
In May 1971, Illusie defended a state doctorate ((in French) Thèse d’État) entitled "Cotangent complex; application to the theory of deformations" at the University of Paris-Sud, in front of a jury composed of Alexander Grothendieck, Michel Demazure and Jean-Pierre Serre and presided by Henri Cartan.

The thesis was published in French by Springer-Verlag as a two-volume book (in 1971 & 1972). The main results of the thesis are summarized in a paper in English (entitled "Cotangent complex and Deformations of torsors and group schemes") presented in Halifax, at Dalhousie University, in January 1971 as part of a colloquium on algebraic geometry. This paper, originally published by Springer-Verlag in 1972, also exists in a slightly extended version.

Illusie's construction of the cotangent complex generalizes that of Michel André and Daniel Quillen to morphisms of ringed topoi. The generality of the framework makes it possible to apply the formalism to various first-order deformation problems: schemes, morphisms of schemes, group schemes and torsors under group schemes. Results concerning commutative group schemes in particular were the key tool in Grothendieck's proof of his existence and structure theorem for infinitesimal deformations of Barsotti–Tate groups, an ingredient in Gerd Faltings' proof of the Mordell conjecture. In Chapter VIII of the second volume of the thesis, Illusie introduces and studies derived de Rham complexes.

== Awards ==
Illusie has received the Langevin Prize of the French Academy of Sciences in 1977 and, in 2012, the Émile Picard Medal of the French Academy of Sciences for "his fundamental work on the cotangent complex, the Picard–Lefschetz formula, Hodge theory and logarithmic geometry".

== Selected works ==
- Complexe cotangent et déformations, Lecture Notes in Mathematics 239 et 283, Berlin and New York, Springer, 1971–1972.
- (ed.) Cohomologie ℓ-adique et fonctions L, Séminaire de Géométrie Algébrique du Bois-Marie 1965–66, SGA 5, dir. A. Grothendieck, Lecture Notes in Mathematics 589, Berlin and New York, Springer, 1977.
- (with Pierre Berthelot and Alexander Grothendieck), Théorie des intersections et théorème de Riemann–Roch, Séminaire de Géométrie Algébrique du Bois Marie 1966–67, SGA 6, Lecture Notes in Mathematics 225, Berlin and New York, Springer, 1971.
- "Complexe de de Rham–Witt et cohomologie cristalline", Annales Scientifiques de l'École Normale Supérieure, 1979, ser. 4, vol. 12, 4, pp. 501–661, url=http://archive.numdam.org/ARCHIVE/ASENS/ASENS_1979_4_12_4/ASENS_1979_4_12_4_501_0/ASENS_1979_4_12_4_501_0.pdf.
- (coed. with Jean Giraud and Michel Raynaud), Surfaces algébriques, Séminaire de géométrie algébrique d'Orsay 1976–78, Lecture Notes in Mathematics 868, Berlin and New York, Springer, 1981.
- (with Michel Raynaud), "Les suites spectrales ssociées au complexe de De Rham–Witt", Publ. Math. IHÉS, vol. 57, 1983, pp. 73–212.
- (with Pierre Deligne),"Relèvements modulo p^{2} et décomposition du complexe de de Rham", Inv. math. (1987), vol. 89, pp. 247–270.
- "Sur la formule de Picard–Lefschetz", in Algebraic Geometry 2000, ed. Azumino (Hotaka), Advanced Studies in Pure Mathematics 36, 2002, pp. 249–268, Mathematical Society of Japan, Tokyo.
