= Grothendieck existence theorem =

In mathematics, the Grothendieck existence theorem, introduced by Grothendieck (1961, section 5), gives conditions that enable one to lift infinitesimal deformations of a scheme to a deformation, and to lift schemes over infinitesimal neighborhoods over a subscheme of a scheme S to schemes over S.

The theorem can be viewed as an instance of (Grothendieck's) formal GAGA.

== See also ==
- Chow's lemma
