= Mathematische Arbeitstagung =

Annual mathematical conference in Bonn, Germany

The Mathematische Arbeitstagung taking place annually in Bonn since 1957, and founded by Friedrich Hirzebruch, was an international meeting of mathematicians intended to act in clearing-house fashion, by disseminating current research ideas; and, at the same time, to bring mathematics in West Germany back into its place in European trends. It proved highly successful in attracting the cream of younger mathematicians, partly because its structure was not that of the conventional international conference. The programme of talks was decided 'in real time' only, rather than in advance.

For example, in 1962 the meeting was dominated by talks on K-theory, at that time the breaking news. The early participants included Jean-Pierre Serre, Jacques Tits, Alexander Grothendieck, Hans Grauert, Nicolaas Kuiper, Raoul Bott, John Milnor, Stephen Smale, Armand Borel, Shiing-Shen Chern, Kunihiko Kodaira, Donald Spencer, Michael Atiyah, Isadore Singer, Shreeram Shankar Abhyankar, Michel Kervaire, Marcel Berger, Karl Stein, Reinhold Remmert, René Thom, Serge Lang and Frank Adams.

The institutional structure was reinforced from 1969 by the Sonderforschungsbereich Theoretische Mathematik programme, and from 1980 by the founding of the Max Planck Institute for Mathematics in Bonn.
