= Hanka Grothendieck =

German writer and anarchist activist (1900–1957)

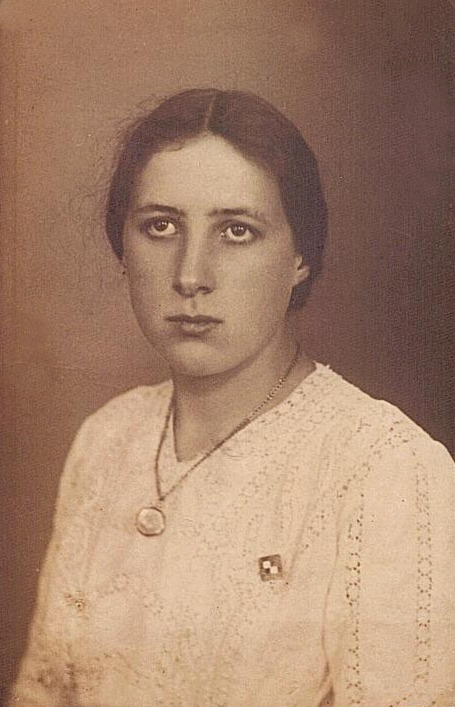
- Grothendieck in 1917
- Born: Johanna Grothendieck; 21 August 1900; Blankenese, Holstein, German Empire
- Died: 16 December 1957 (aged 57); Bois-Colombes, Paris, France
- Occupations: Writer, teacher
- Spouse: Alf Raddatz (m. 1921; sep. 1924)
- Partner: Sascha Schapiro (1924; d. 1941)
- Children: Maidi Raddatz, Alexander Grothendieck

Johanna "Hanka" Grothendieck (1900–1957) was a German writer, teacher and anarchist activist. The partner of Russian anarchist Sascha Schapiro and mother of the mathematician Alexander Grothendieck, in 1933, she fled Nazi Germany to France, where she made a living as a German teacher. During World War II, she and her son were held in a number of French internment camps; the Nazis killed her husband in the Holocaust.

== Biography ==
Johanna Grothendieck was born in the North German town of Blankenese, on 21 August 1900. Her surname, Grothendieck, comes from the Plattdütsch word for "big dike". After growing up, she moved to Berlin, where she married Alf Raddatz, with whom she had a daughter Maidi.

In 1924, she met Sascha Schapiro, a veteran of the Makhnovist movement. Schapiro introduced himself to Raddatz with the words "I will steal your wife", and the two began a relationship together. Throughout the 1920s, she was involved in far-left politics and became a writer. On 28 March 1928, she gave birth to their son, Alexander Grothendieck. The family lived together in the German capital until Adolf Hitler's rise to power in 1933, when Grothendieck and Schapiro fled to France, leaving their son in foster care in Germany. They moved to Paris, where Grothendieck taught the German language.

Following the outbreak of the Spanish Civil War, she and Schapiro went to Spain to support the Republicans. In September 1937, she moved to Nîmes, where she worked as a governess for a local police commissioner. There she collaborated with the Makhnovist veteran Volin, as well as the French anarchist André Prudhommeaux, on the anarchist journal Terre Libre. In May 1939, she returned to Paris, where she reunited with her husband and son.

At the outbreak of World War II, in September 1939, the family moved to Nîmes, but Schapiro was arrested and interned in Camp Vernet the following month. Following the Nazi occupation of France, he was deported to the Auschwitz concentration camp, where the Nazis murdered him. In March 1940, Grothendieck and her son left Nîmes in order to support a colony of Spanish refugees in Mouriès, which was later moved to Marseille. On 1 August 1940, the Vichy regime arrested Grothendieck herself, and interned her and her son in the Rieucros Camp. The authorities then transferred her to the Camp de Brens, while her son managed to find refuge at the Le Collège-Lycée Cévenol International in Le Chambon-sur-Lignon.

Following the Liberation of France, Grothendieck reunited with her son in Meyrargues. While Alexander began studying mathematics, Grothendieck herself began writing an autobiographical novel (Eine Frau, describing her life until 1927; has remained unpublished) and reunited with Prudhommeaux. In 1948, she and her son moved to Paris. She settled in the Parisian suburb of Bois-Colombes, where she died on 16 December 1957. Her son dedicated his doctoral dissertation to his mother.

== See also ==
- Anarchism in Germany

== Bibliography ==
- Cartier, Pierre (2015). "Alexander Grothendieck: A Country Known Only by Name" (PDF). Notices of the AMS. 62 (4): 373–382.
- Enckell, Marianne; Vidal, Daniel (23 December 2021) [3 April 2014]. "GROTHENDIECK Hanka (Johanna), épouse Raddatz". Dictionnaire des anarchistes (in French).
- Pragacz, Piotr (2006). "The life and work of Alexander Grothendieck". The American Mathematical Monthly. 113 (9): 831–846. doi:10.1080/00029890.2006.11920372.
- Scharlau, Winfried (2008). "Who is Alexander Grothendieck" (PDF). Notices of the AMS. 55 (8): 930–941.
