= Émile Picard Medal =

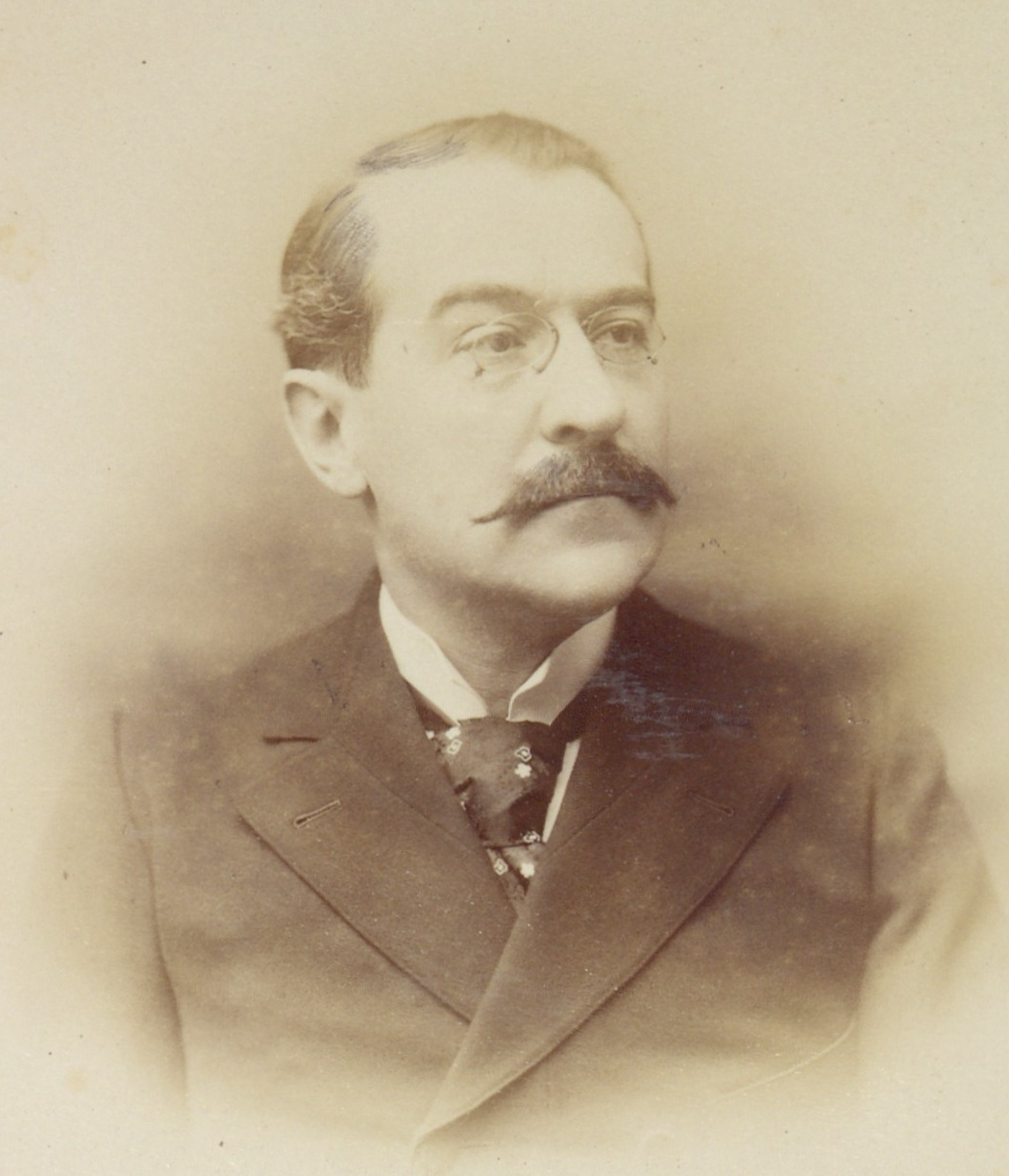
Portrait of Charles-Emile Picard (1909)

The Émile Picard Medal (or Médaille Émile Picard) is a medal named for Émile Picard awarded every 6 years to an outstanding mathematician by the Institut de France, Académie des sciences. This rewards a mathematician designated by the Academy of Sciences every six years. The first medal was awarded in 1946.

== Recipients ==
The Émile Picard Medal recipients are

- 1946: Maurice Fréchet
- 1953: Paul Lévy
- 1959: Henri Cartan
- 1965: Szolem Mandelbrojt
- 1971: Jean-Pierre Serre
- 1977: Alexandre Grothendieck
- 1983: André Néron
- 1989: François Bruhat
- 1995: Jean-Pierre Kahane
- 2001: Jacques Dixmier
- 2007: Louis Boutet de Monvel
- 2012: Luc Illusie
- 2018: Yves Colin de Verdière
- 2025: Marie-France Vignéras

== See also ==
- List of mathematics awards
