= Sascha Schapiro =

Ukrainian anarchist (1889–1942)

Sascha Schapiro Александр Шапиро Олександр Шапіро
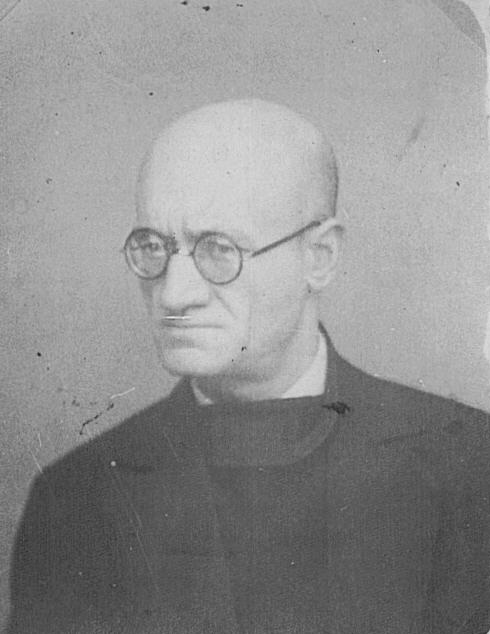
- Born: c. 1889; Novozybkov, Russian Empire
- Died: 1942; Birkenau extermination camp
- Known for: Anarchism, Participation in the Russian Revolution, Participation in the Spanish Civil War
- Partner: Hanka Grothendieck
- Children: Alexander Grothendieck

Alexander "Sascha" Schapiro (Russian: Александр Шапиро, Ukrainian: Олександр Шапіро; c. 1889 – 1942), also known by the noms de guerre Alexander Tanarov, Sascha Piotr, and Sergei, was a Jewish Russian anarchist who fought in both the Russian Civil War and the Spanish Civil War. Born to a wealthy family, Schapiro renounced the privileges of his upbringing and became affiliated with anarchists in his teenage years. After the dawn of the Russian Revolution, Schapiro aligned himself with the Revolutionary Army of Ukraine, and he fought alongside Nestor Makhno and Maria Nikiforova until the defeat of the anarchists at the hands of the Red Army in the Russian Civil War.

Following the suppression of anarchism in the Soviet Union, Schapiro escaped to Germany, living in Berlin prior to the rise of Adolf Hitler and the Nazi Party. After the rise of German fascism, Schapiro left for Spain and fought alongside the anarchists in the Second Spanish Republic. Upon the victory of the Spanish fascists and Francisco Franco, Schapiro escaped and attempted to hide in Nazi-occupied France, but he was quickly found by the Vichy authorities and handed over to the Nazis. Schapiro was subsequently murdered in the Auschwitz-Birkenau extermination camp in 1942.

While living in Berlin, Schapiro was in a relationship with fellow anarchist and journalist Johanna Grothendieck. Grothendieck gave birth to Schapiro's son Alexander Grothendieck in 1928. Alexander Grothendieck would go on to become one of the most famous and renowned mathematicians of the 20th century.

== Early years and Russian revolutions ==
Born into a Hasidic family in the predominantly Jewish border town of Novozybkov, Russia in 1889, Alexander Schapiro grew up identifying more with the impoverished proletariat than with his own well-to-do family. In 1904 at the age of fourteen, he left the town and joined an anarchist militant group (akin to the Chernoznamentsy) who were rounded up by the authorities in 1905 after an unsuccessful attempt to murder Czar Nicholas II. All were executed save Schapiro, who was spared on account of his youth, and was instead sentenced to life imprisonment in Moscow. He escaped lingering death there by the intercession of an influential friend who secured his transfer to Yaroslavl, where he stayed for twelve years. It was here that Schapiro was shot in his left arm whilst trying to escape, resulting in its amputation. After an attempted suicide, he spent the year 1914 in solitary confinement.

With the collapse of the Czarist regime in Russia in 1917, Schapiro was released, and hailed as a national hero. He was one of a number of anarchists who spoke out against the representative system for electing the Constituent Assembly proposed by Alexander Kerensky's Russian Provisional Government, writing that "no parliament can break the path toward liberty, that the good society can be realized only through 'the abolition of all power'". He befriended the anarchist revolutionaries Lev Chernyi and Maria Nikiforova and became a leading figure in a cadre of heavily armed anarchists fighting in Ukraine associated with Nestor Makhno's Insurgent Army. Schapiro lead a tempestuous life in Russia between 1917 and 1921 in an atmosphere of increasing repression of anarchists by the Bolshevik regime, marrying a Jewish woman named Rachil, with whom he had a son, Dodek. In an attempt to evade the Bolsheviks searching for him, he fled in 1921 to Minsk, where he encountered and was financially supported by Alexander Berkman. With the assistance of a Jewish woman named Leah, Schapiro then crossed the Russian-Polish border using forged papers bearing the name of Alexander Tanarov.

== Life in Europe, family and death ==
By 1922, Schapiro had reached Berlin, where he remained save for spells in Paris and Belgium until 1924. There, he assumed the name Sacha Piotr and throughout the 1920s was an active participant in the anarchist movement, in 1928 becoming friends with prominent Spanish anarcho-syndicalists Francisco Ascaso and Buenaventura Durruti, Italian anarchist Francesco Ghezzi and German author Theodor Plievier, who dedicated his 1927 novel Stienka Rasin to Schapiro. In Paris, he was a regular at the artist's hangout Café Dome, and befriended journalist and artist Aron Brzezinski, who made a bronze bust of him, as well as the novelist Scholem Asch. During this period he was in infrequent contact with Makhno and his platformist Delo truda group, who were based in Paris.

Schapiro was one of the founding members, alongside Sébastien Faure, Ugo Fedeli and Henryk Walecki, of the Paris-based Œuvres Internationales Des Editions Anarchistes (International Works of Anarchist Editions). He contributed at least two articles to the publication, run at that time by the anarchist Severin Ferandel.

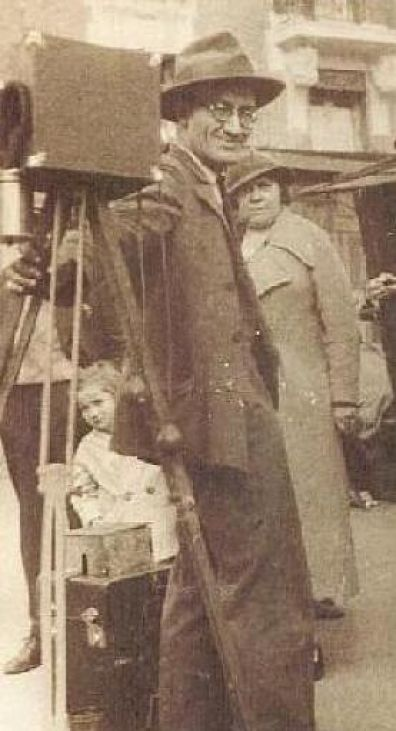
Schapiro as a street photographer

Schapiro met anarchist journalist Hanka Grothendieck, who was then married to left wing journalist Alf Raddatz, through the movement in Berlin while working as a street photographer. Due to the increasingly anti-Semitic environment in Europe at the time, the couple decided to give their son Alexander the surname of Grothendieck's well-established Hamburg middle-class family. Forced to flee Germany after the rise to power of Adolf Hitler, and intent on fighting in the coming Spanish Civil War, the couple sent Alexander to live with the Heydorns, a middle-class family with anarchist sympathies, in 1933.

In Spain, under the name Sacha Pietra, Schapiro fought the fascists until the defeat of the Second Spanish Republic, after which he and his wife crossed the French border and he was interned at Camp Vernet with his comrades. The Heydorns had cared for Alexander in Berlin for seven years, but decided in May 1939, shortly before France entered the Second World War, that it had become too dangerous to keep him and he was put on a train to Paris to his parents.

In Occupied Paris, Schapiro was free for a short time, constantly active in the anarchist movement, until he was arrested and sent to Camp Vernet, then deported to Auschwitz concentration camp in 1942, where he was subsequently murdered.

== See also ==
- Anarchism in Ukraine
