= Yves Colin de Verdière =

French mathematician

- Education: Paris Diderot University
- Known for: Colin de Verdière graph invariant
- Awards: Prize Ampère; Fellow of the United States National Academy of Sciences; Émile Picard Medal
- Scientific career
- Fields: Mathematics
- Workplaces: Joseph Fourier University
- Doctoral advisor: Marcel Berger

Yves Colin de Verdière is a French mathematician.

== Life ==
He studied at the École Normale Supérieure in Paris in the late 1960s, obtained his Ph.D. in 1973, and then spent the bulk of his working life as faculty at Joseph Fourier University in Grenoble. He retired in December 2005.

== Work ==
Colin de Verdière is known for work in spectral theory, in particular on the semiclassical limit of quantum mechanics (including quantum chaos); in graph theory where he introduced a new graph invariant, the Colin de Verdière graph invariant; and on a variety of other subjects within Riemannian geometry and number theory.

== Honors and awards ==
His contributions have been recognized by several awards: senior member of the Institut Universitaire de France from 1991 to 2001; Prize Ampère of the French Academy of Sciences in 1999; Fellow of the American Academy of Arts and Sciences in 2004; Émile Picard Medal of the French Academy of Sciences in 2018. He was an invited speaker at the International Congress of Mathematicians, held in Berkeley, California in 1986.

== Selected works ==
=== Journal articles ===
- Colin de Verdiere, Y. (September 1985). "Ergodicité et fonctions propres du laplacien". Communications in Mathematical Physics. 102 (3): 497–502. doi:10.1007/BF01209296.
- de Verdière, Yves Colin (December 1991). "Un principe variationnel pour les empilements de cercles". Inventiones mathematicae. 104 (1): 655–669. doi:10.1007/BF01245096.
- de Verdière, Yves Colin (October 1990). "Sur un nouvel invariant des graphes et un critère de planarité". Journal of Combinatorial Theory, Series B. 50 (1): 11–21. doi:10.1016/0095-8956(90)90093-F.

=== Books ===
- Colin de Verdière, Yves (1998). Spectres de graphes. Marseille Paris: Société mathématique de France. ISBN 2-85629-068-X.
