= Grothendieck trace theorem =

Extension of Lidskii's theorem

In functional analysis, the Grothendieck trace theorem is an extension of Lidskii's theorem about the trace and the determinant of a certain class of nuclear operators on Banach spaces, the so-called $\tfrac{2}{3}$-nuclear operators. The theorem was proven in 1955 by Alexander Grothendieck. Lidskii's theorem does not hold in general for Banach spaces.

The theorem should not be confused with the Grothendieck trace formula from algebraic geometry.

== Grothendieck trace theorem ==
Given a Banach space $(B,\|\cdot\|)$ with the approximation property and denote its dual as $B'$.

=== 2/3-nuclear operators ===
Let $A$ be a nuclear operator on $B$, then $A$ is a $\tfrac{2}{3}$-nuclear operator if it has a decomposition of the form
$$A = \sum\limits_{k=1}^{\infty}\varphi_k \otimes f_k$$
where $\varphi_k \in B$ and $f_k \in B'$ and
$$\sum\limits_{k=1}^{\infty}\|\varphi_k\|^{2/3} \|f_k\|^{2/3} < \infty.$$

=== Grothendieck's trace theorem ===
Let $\lambda_j(A)$ denote the eigenvalues of a $\tfrac{2}{3}$-nuclear operator $A$ counted with their algebraic multiplicities. If
$$\sum\limits_j |\lambda_j(A)| < \infty$$
then the following equalities hold:
$$\operatorname{tr}A = \sum\limits_j |\lambda_j(A)|$$
and for the Fredholm determinant
$$\operatorname{det}(I+A) = \prod\limits_j (1+\lambda_j(A)).$$

== See also ==
- Nuclear operators between Banach spaces

== Literature ==
- Gohberg, Israel; Goldberg, Seymour; Krupnik, Nahum (1991). Traces and Determinants of Linear Operators. Operator Theory Advances and Applications. Basel: Birkhäuser. p. 102. ISBN 978-3-7643-6177-8.
