= Delta-functor =

Functor between abelian categories

In homological algebra, a δ-functor between two abelian categories A and B is a collection of functors from A to B together with a collection of morphisms that satisfy properties generalising those of derived functors. A universal δ-functor is a δ-functor satisfying a specific universal property related to extending morphisms beyond "degree 0". These notions were introduced by Alexander Grothendieck in his "Tohoku paper" to provide an appropriate setting for derived functors. In particular, derived functors are universal δ-functors.

The terms homological δ-functor and cohomological δ-functor are sometimes used to distinguish between the case where the morphisms "go down" (homological) and the case where they "go up" (cohomological). In particular, one of these modifiers is always implicit, although often left unstated.

== Definition ==
Given two abelian categories A and B a covariant cohomological δ-functor between A and B is a family {T^{n}} of covariant additive functors T^{n} : A → B indexed by the non-negative integers, and for each short exact sequence

$$0\rightarrow M^\prime\rightarrow M\rightarrow M^{\prime\prime}\rightarrow0$$

a family of morphisms

$$\delta^n:T^n(M^{\prime\prime})\rightarrow T^{n+1}(M^\prime)$$

indexed by the non-negative integers satisfying the following two properties:

1. For each short exact sequence as above, there is a long exact sequence
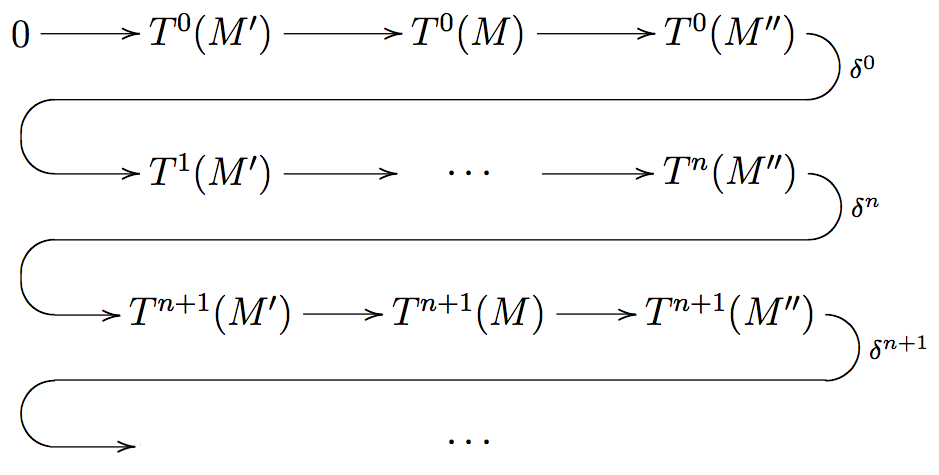
2. For each morphism of short exact sequences
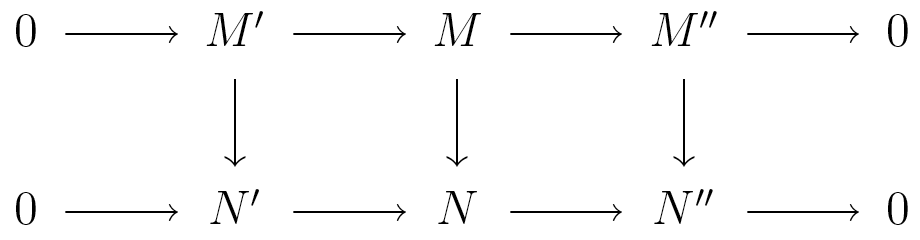
  and for each non-negative n, the induced square
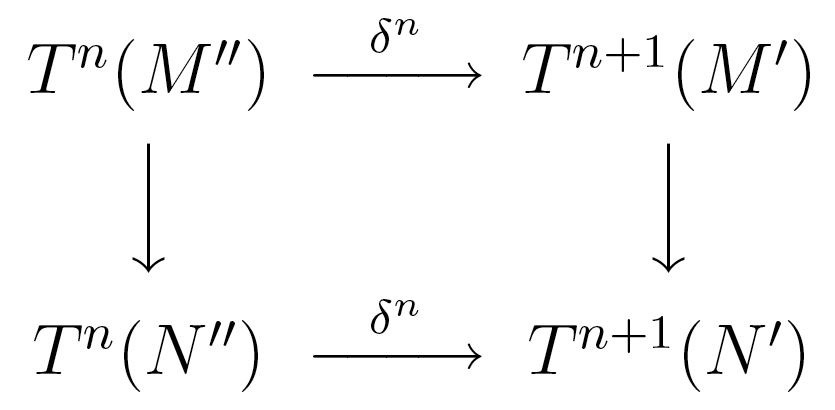
  is commutative (the δ^{n} on the top is that corresponding to the short exact sequence of M's whereas the one on the bottom corresponds to the short exact sequence of N's).

The second property expresses the functoriality of a δ-functor. The modifier "cohomological" indicates that the δ^{n} raise the index on the T. A covariant homological δ-functor between A and B is similarly defined (and generally uses subscripts), but with δ_{n} a morphism T_{n}(M '') → T_{n-1}(M'). The notions of contravariant cohomological δ-functor between A and B and contravariant homological δ-functor between A and B can also be defined by "reversing the arrows" accordingly.

=== Morphisms of δ-functors ===
A morphism of δ-functors is a family of natural transformations that, for each short exact sequence, commute with the morphisms δ. For example, in the case of two covariant cohomological δ-functors denoted S and T, a morphism from S to T is a family F_{n} : S^{n} → T^{n} of natural transformations such that for every short exact sequence

$$0\rightarrow M^\prime\rightarrow M\rightarrow M^{\prime\prime}\rightarrow0$$

the following diagram commutes:

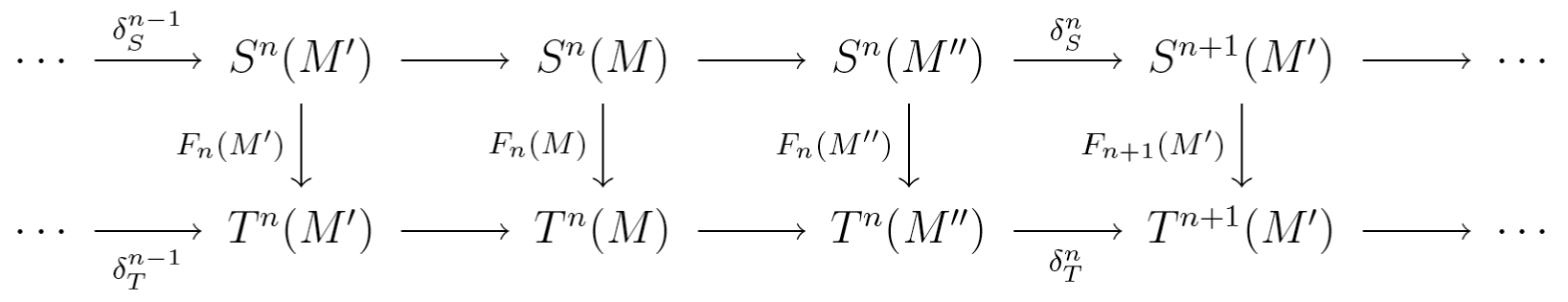

=== Universal δ-functor ===
A universal δ-functor is characterized by the (universal) property that giving a morphism F from it to any other δ-functor (between A and B) is equivalent to giving just F_{0}. If S denotes a covariant cohomological δ-functor between A and B, then S is universal if given any other (covariant cohomological) δ-functor T (between A and B), and given any natural transformation

$$F_0:S^0\rightarrow T^0$$

there is a unique sequence F_{n} indexed by the positive integers such that the family { F_{n} }_{n ≥ 0} is a morphism of δ-functors.

== See also ==
- Effaceable functor
