= Abstract nonsense =

Tongue-in-cheek description of category theory and abstract mathematics

In mathematics, abstract nonsense, general abstract nonsense, generalized abstract nonsense, and general nonsense are nonderogatory terms used by mathematicians to describe long, theoretical parts of a proof they skip over when readers are expected to be familiar with them. These terms are mainly used for abstract methods related to category theory and homological algebra. More generally, "abstract nonsense" may refer to a proof that relies on category-theoretic methods, or even to the study of category theory itself.

== Background ==
Roughly speaking, category theory is the study of the general form, that is, categories of mathematical theories, without regard to their content. As a result, mathematical proofs that rely on category-theoretic ideas often seem out-of-context, somewhat akin to a non sequitur. Authors sometimes dub these proofs "abstract nonsense" as a light-hearted way of alerting readers to their abstract nature. Labeling an argument "abstract nonsense" is usually not intended to be derogatory, and is instead used jokingly, in a self-deprecating way, affectionately, or even as a compliment to the generality of the argument. Alexander Grothendieck was critical of this notion, and stated that:

The introduction of the cipher 0 or the group concept was general nonsense too, and mathematics was more or less stagnating for thousands of years because nobody was around to take such childish steps...

Certain ideas and constructions in mathematics share a uniformity throughout many domains, unified by category theory. Typical methods include the use of classifying spaces and universal properties, use of the Yoneda lemma, natural transformations between functors, and diagram chasing.

When an audience can be assumed to be familiar with the general form of such arguments, mathematicians will use the expression "Such and such is true by abstract nonsense" rather than provide an elaborate explanation of particulars. For example, one might say that "By abstract nonsense, products are unique up to isomorphism when they exist", instead of arguing about how these isomorphisms can be derived from the universal property that defines the product. This allows one to skip proof details that can be considered trivial or not providing much insight, focusing instead on genuinely innovative parts of a larger proof.

== History ==
The term predates the foundation of category theory as a subject itself. Referring to a joint paper with Samuel Eilenberg that introduced the notion of a "category" in 1942, Saunders Mac Lane wrote the subject was 'then called "general abstract nonsense"'. The term is often used to describe the application of category theory and its techniques to less abstract domains.

The term is believed to have been coined by the mathematician Norman Steenrod, himself one of the developers of the categorical point of view.
