= Survivre et vivre =

Survivre et Vivre
- Formation: 27 July 1970
- Founder: Alexander Grothendieck
- Dissolved: 1975
- Purpose: Political ecology
- Region served: France, Canada, United States
- Official language: French

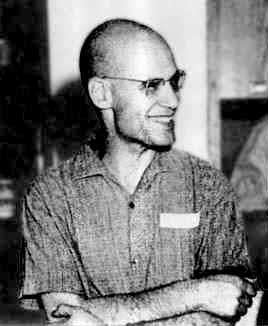
Alexander Grothendieck in 1970.

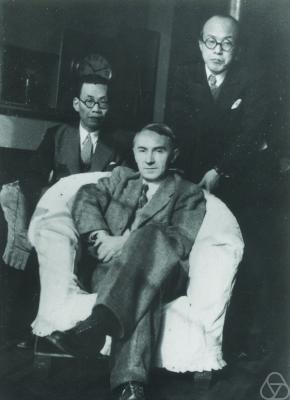
Claude Chevalley (front).

Survivre (Survive), later renamed Survivre et Vivre (Survive and Live), was a political group founded on 27 July 1970 in Montreal, with the goals of promoting pacificism, ecology, and a new kind of science. It was headed by the French mathematician Alexander Grothendieck and later included several other well-known mathematicians such as Claude Chevalley and Pierre Samuel, as well as about 50 or 60 other members, both in North America and France. From August 1970 to June 1975, they published the journal Survivre... et vivre.

Grothendieck left in 1972 or 1973 and the visionary group dissolved in the middle of the 1970s, its members dispersing, or joining more politically engaged groups, or magazines like La Gueule Ouverte.

== Purpose and activities ==
The group's purpose, as Alexander Grothendieck put it, was "the struggle for the survival of the human species, and even of life itself, threatened by the growing ecological imbalance caused by the indiscriminate use of science and technology and by suicidal social mechanisms, and also threatened by conflicts related to the proliferation of military devices and arms industries".

Grothendieck, a celebrated mathematician, was frequently invited to give talks in which he would combine mathematics with a discussion of the group's goals. He often asked the question "Can we continue scientific research?", arguing that specialized science was an extremely destructive and dangerous activity as it provided the tools for ecological destruction and world war. He promoted a New Science which would focus on the needs and desires of the people, involve non-specialists who perform research at their primary occupations, and would employ a holistic methodology in communion with nature.

== Journal ==
The journal was originally issued monthly starting from August 1970, then announced a bimonthly rhythm in June 1971, and finally adopted an irregular rhythm until its final issue (number 19) in 1975. The issues appeared in French, some were also translated into English.

Many articles were written by Grothendieck, sometimes unsigned or under his pseudonym Diogène.

- Survivre, issue 1, August 1970, 41 pages,
- Survivre, issue 2/3, September/Octobre 1970, 39 pages,
- Survivre, issue 4, Novembre 1970, 24 pages,
- Survivre, issue 5, Decembre 1970, 24 pages,
- Survivre, issue 6, January 1971, 26 pages,
- Survivre, issue 7, February–May 1971, 30 pages,
- Survivre, issue 8, June–July 1971, 32 pages, first illustrated cover,
- Survivre… et vivre, issue 9, August–September 1971, 39 pages,
- Survivre… et vivre, issue 10, October–November 1971, 41 pages,
- Survivre… et vivre, issue 11, March 1972, 40 pages,
- Survivre… et vivre, issue 12, June 1972, 41 pages,
- Survivre… et vivre, issue 13, August–September 1972,
- Survivre… et vivre, issue 14, October–November 1972, 48 pages,
- Survivre… et vivre, issue 15, January–February 1973, 32 pages,
- Survivre… et vivre, issue 16, June 1973, 40 pages,
- Survivre… et vivre, issue 17, Winter 1973, 48 pages,
- Survivre… et vivre, issue 18, 1974,
- Survivre… et vivre, issue 19, June 1975, 36 pages.

== See also ==
- Science for the People
- Will we continue scientific research ?
