= T. D. Ramakrishnan =

Indian novelist and translator

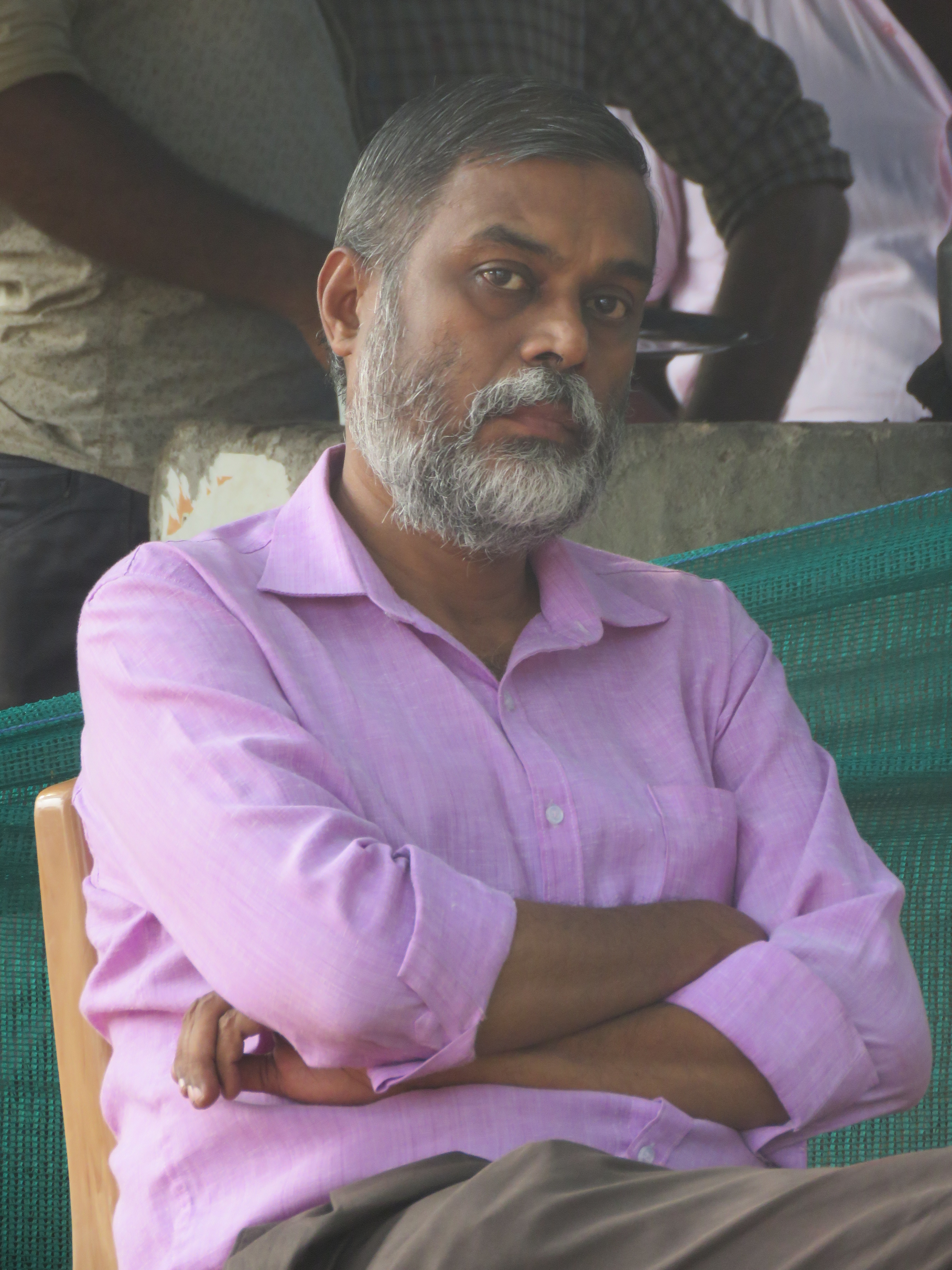
- Ramakrishnan at Pedayangode in 2018
- Born: 1961 (age 64–65); Eyyal, Thrissur, Kerala, India
- Education: Union Christian College, Aluva
- Occupations: Writer; translator; Indian Railways Chief Controller (retired)
- Spouse: Anandavalli
- Children: 2
- Writing career
- Language: Malayalam
- Notable works: Francis Itty Cora, Sugandhi Enna Andal Devanayaki

Thathamangalam Damodaran Ramakrishnan (born 1961) is an Indian novelist, translator, and retired Chief Controller in Southern Railway. He has authored two best-selling Malayalam novels: Francis Itty Cora and Sugandhi Enna Andal Devanayaki. He is a recipient of the Kerala Sahitya Akademi Award, Kerala Sahityotsav Award and Vayalar Award.

== Early life ==
He was born at Eyyal village in Thrissur, India in 1961 to a Brahmin family as the son of Damodaran Elayathu and Sreedevi Antarjanam. He completed his schooling from Kunnamkulam Boys High School and Erumappetty Government High School, and his pre-degree and degree from UC College, Aluva. In 1981, he joined Indian Railways as a ticket collector in Salem. He worked in Kozhikode for one and a half years from 1982. In 1983, he worked as a ticket examiner in Madras and Salem. He moved to Palghat in 1985. From 1995 onwards, he became a controller in the Palghat Railway Divisional Office. He served as Southern Railway Chief Controller from January 2006 to 31 January 2016. On 31 January 2016, he retired from service in order to be active in literature.

== Literary career ==
His first novel Alpha is set in an imaginative island called Alpha which is located somewhere near Sri Lanka and narrates the story of an experiment on human brain undertaken by an anthropologist. His second novel, Francis Itty Cora, received considerable acclaims from critics for its unprecedented incorporation of many global historical characters and knowledge available to the present Malayalam readers for weaving the story line. The novel deals with the exploration of a merchant named Francis Itty Cora, hailing from the Kerala of 15th century. His third novel, Sugandhi Enna Andal Devanayaki, is based on the death of Tamil human rights activist Rajini Thiranagama who was allegedly shot dead by Tamil Tigers cadres after she criticised them for their atrocities.

Ramakrishnan, who had lived in Tamil Nadu for the most part of his career, is also deeply associated with Tamil literature. He introduced several Tamil literary works to Keralites and has won the E. K. Divakaran Potti Award for Best Translator in 2007.

== Personal life ==
He is married to Anandavalli and has two children: Vishnu and Surya .

== List of works ==
- Alpha (Novel)
- Francis Itty Cora (Novel)
- Sugandhi Enna Andal Devanayaki (Novel)
- Hmm (Translation of the Tamil novel Hmm by Shobasakthi)
- Thappu Thalangal (Translation of the Tamil book Thappu Thalangal by Charu Nivedita
- Mama Africa (Novel)
- Andhar Badirar Mookar (Novel)
- Pacha Manja Chuvappu (Novel)
- Korappapanu Sthuthiyayirikkatte (കോരപ്പാപ്പന് സ്തുതിയായിരിക്കട്ടെ) (Novel)

== Filmography ==
Year	Title	Role	Director	Notes
2018	Oolu	Screenwriter	Shaji N. Karun	Debut film
2024	Bramayugam	Co-written with Rahul Sadasivan	Rahul Sadasivan	Dialogues only

== Awards ==
- 2016: Kerala Sahitya Akademi Award for Novel – Sugandhi Enna Andal Devanayaki
- 2016: Malayattoor Award – Sugandhi Enna Andal Devanayaki
- 2016: Abu Dhabi Sakthi Award for Novel – Sugandhi Enna Andal Devanayaki
- 2017: Vayalar Award – Sugandhi Enna Andal Devanayaki
- 2025: Kerala Sahityotsav Award
