= Parafactorial local ring =

In algebraic geometry, a Noetherian local ring R is called parafactorial if it has depth at least 2 and the Picard group Pic(Spec(R) − m) of its spectrum with the closed point m removed is trivial.

More generally, a scheme X is called parafactorial along a closed subset Z if the subset Z is "too small" for invertible sheaves to detect; more precisely if for every open set V the map from P(V) to P(V ∩ U) is an equivalence of categories, where U = X – Z and P(V) is the category of invertible sheaves on V. A Noetherian local ring is parafactorial if and only if its spectrum is parafactorial along its closed point.

Parafactorial local rings were introduced by Grothendieck (1967, 21.13, 1968, XI 3.1,3.2)

== Examples ==
- Every Noetherian local ring of dimension at least 2 that is factorial is parafactorial. However local rings of dimension at most 1 are not parafactorial, even if they are factorial.
- Every Noetherian complete intersection local ring of dimension at least 4 is parafactorial.
- For a locally Noetherian scheme, a closed subset is parafactorial if the local ring at every point of the subset is parafactorial. For a locally Noetherian regular scheme, the closed parafactorial subsets are those of codimension at least 2.
