= Francis Itty Cora =

Malayalam Novel

- Author: T. D. Ramakrishnan
- Original title: ഫ്രാൻസിസ് ഇട്ടിക്കോര
- Illustrator: K. Sudheesh
- Cover artist: N. Ajayan
- Language: Malayalam
- Genre: Thriller, mystery
- Publisher: D. C. Books
- Publication date: 2009 August
- Publication place: India
- Pages: 308
- ISBN: 978-81-264-2458-0

Francis Itty Cora is a mystery novel in Malayalam by author T. D. Ramakrishnan.

== Overview ==
The 2009 novel received acclaim from critics for its incorporation of global historical characters and knowledge available. Like The Journeyer, the novel deals with the exploration of a merchant named Francis Itty Cora, hailing from the Kerala of 15th century. Among the historical characters include Vasco da Gama, Hypatia and Lorenzo de' Medici. The current global knowledge include Abu Ghraib torture and prisoner abuse and primacy of Kerala school of mathematics. Like The Da Vinci Code, this novel is of Christian background and tries to convince the reader an alternative possibility of what happened in the past in the Nazrani community of Malabar.

The English translation with the same title was released at the DC International Book Fair and Cultural on 5 March 2014.
