= Vector bundles on algebraic curves =

In mathematics, vector bundles on algebraic curves may be studied as holomorphic vector bundles on compact Riemann surfaces, which is the classical approach, or as locally free sheaves on algebraic curves C in a more general, algebraic setting (which can for example admit singular points).

Some foundational results on classification were known in the 1950s. The result of Grothendieck (1957), that holomorphic vector bundles on the Riemann sphere are sums of line bundles, is now often called the Birkhoff–Grothendieck theorem, since it is implicit in much earlier work of Birkhoff (1909) on the Riemann–Hilbert problem.

Atiyah (1957) gave the classification of vector bundles on elliptic curves.

The Riemann–Roch theorem for vector bundles was proved by Weil (1938), before the 'vector bundle' concept had really any official status. Although, associated ruled surfaces were classical objects. See Hirzebruch–Riemann–Roch theorem for his result. He was seeking a generalization of the Jacobian variety, by passing from holomorphic line bundles to higher rank. This idea would prove fruitful, in terms of moduli spaces of vector bundles. following on the work in the 1960s on geometric invariant theory.

== See also ==
- Hitchin system
