= Effaceable functor =

In mathematics, an effaceable functor is an additive functor F between abelian categories C and D for which, for each object A in C, there exists a monomorphism $u: A \to M$, for some M, such that $F(u) = 0$.

Similarly, a coeffaceable functor is one for which, for each A, there is an epimorphism into A that is killed by F. The notions were introduced in Grothendieck's Tohoku paper.

A theorem of Grothendieck says that every effaceable δ-functor (i.e., effaceable in each positive degree) is universal.
