= Grothendieck's relative point of view =

Mathematical heuristic

Grothendieck's relative point of view is a heuristic applied in certain abstract mathematical situations, with a rough meaning of taking for consideration families of "objects" explicitly depending on parameters as the basic field of study, rather than a single such object. It is named after Alexander Grothendieck, who made extensive use of it in treating foundational aspects of algebraic geometry. Outside that field, it has been influential particularly on category theory and categorical logic.

== Formulations ==
In the usual formulation, the point of view treats not objects X of a given category C, but morphisms

f: X → S

where S is a fixed object.

A statement in informal language is "the various aspects of an object can be made manifest once it is put in relation with other objects". The concept of representable functor can make that point more precise: an object is as good as its representable functor. Representable functors were defined explicitly in the "Tôhoku paper" of 1957.

== Grothendieck–Riemann–Roch theorem ==
The Grothendieck–Riemann–Roch theorem from about 1956 is usually cited as the key moment for the introduction of this circle of ideas. The more classical types of Riemann–Roch theorem are recovered in the case where S is a single point (i.e. the final object in the working category C). Using other S is a way to have versions of theorems "with parameters", i.e. allowing for continuous variation, for which the "frozen" version reduces the parameters to constants.

In relation to the Hirzebruch–Riemann–Roch theorem of 1954, Michael Atiyah commented in 1984 that "Grothendieck made a very significant further advance." He expanded his point:

Roughly speaking Grothendieck considered not just one linear system, as Hirzebruch had done, but simultaneously all linear systems with the same parameter space.

As a consequence, "Instead of ending up with a theorem he therefore obtained a whole theory, designated by the succinct but uninformative title of K-theory."

== Applications ==
Reed wrote, in the setting of families of curves in algebraic geometry, that

Grothendieck time and time again shows the power of the [relative] point of view by proving theorems in a "relative" context and showing how the usual "absolute" version becomes a simple consequence.

In other applications, this way of thinking has been used in topos theory, to clarify the role of set theory in foundational matters. Assuming that we don't have a commitment to one 'set theory' (all topoi are in some sense equally set theories for some intuitionistic logic) it is possible to state everything relative to some given set theory that acts as a base topos.

In the respective contexts of formal languages and natural language, the Grothendieck point of view has been cited as relevant to type theory and context-dependence.

== Slice categories, base change and descent ==
This set of ideas is made more formal in the idea of the slice category of objects of C "above" S.

A base change "along" a given morphism

g: T → S

is typically given by the fiber product, producing an object over T from one over S. The "fiber" terminology is significant: the underlying heuristic or intuition is that X over S is a family of fibers, one for each 'point' of S; the fiber product is then the family on T, which described by fibers is for each "point" of T the fiber at its image in S. This set-theoretic language is too naïve to fit the required context, certainly, in algebraic geometry. It fits well, though, by the use of the Yoneda lemma, to replace the "point" idea with that of treating an object such as S, as "as good as" the representable functor it sets up. Representable natural transformations are an example of Grothendieck's relative point of view.

To move from one slice to another by "pullback" therefore requires base change. The related operation in the opposite direction is descent. These ideas persist in contemporary category theory, but the terminology used by Grothendieck, and at the same period by Roger Godement writing about sheaf theory, has undergone a number of changes.

== See also ==
- Fiber product of schemes
- Morphism of schemes
- Fibred category

== Bibliography ==
- Dieudonné, J. (1972). "The Historical Development of Algebraic Geometry". The American Mathematical Monthly. 79 (8): 827–866. doi:10.2307/2317664. ISSN 0002-9890. JSTOR 2317664.
- Gallauer, Martin (2025). "An introduction to six-functor formalisms". Open Book Series. 6: 63–106. arXiv:2112.10456. doi:10.2140/obs.2025.6.63.
