= Hurwitz space =

Moduli spaces of ramified covers

In mathematics, in particular algebraic geometry, Hurwitz spaces are moduli spaces of ramified covers of the projective line, and they are related to the moduli of curves. Their rational points are of interest for the study of the inverse Galois problem, and as such they have been extensively studied by arithmetic geometers. More precisely, Hurwitz spaces classify isomorphism classes of Galois covers with a given automorphism group $G$ and a specified number of branch points. The monodromy conjugacy classes at each branch point are also commonly fixed. These spaces have been introduced by Adolf Hurwitz which (with Alfred Clebsch and Jacob Lüroth) showed the connectedness of the Hurwitz spaces in the case of simply branched covers (i.e., the case where $G$ is a symmetric group and the monodromy classes are the conjugacy class of transpositions).

== Motivation ==
Let $G$ be a finite group. The inverse Galois problem for $G$ asks whether there exists a finite Galois extension $F \mid \Q$ whose Galois group is isomorphic to $G$. By Hilbert's irreducibility theorem, a positive answer to this question may be deduced from the existence, instead, of a finite Galois extension $F \mid \Q(T)$ with Galois group $G$. In other words, one may try to find a connected ramified Galois cover of the projective line $\mathbb{P}^1_{\Q}$ over $\Q$ whose automorphism group is $G$. If one requires that this cover be geometrically connected, that is $F \cap \bar\Q = \Q$, then this stronger form of the inverse Galois problem is called the regular inverse Galois problem.

A motivation for constructing a moduli space of $G$-covers (i.e., geometrically connected Galois covers of $\mathbb{P}^1$ whose automorphism group is $G$) is to transform the regular inverse Galois problem into a problem of Diophantine geometry: if (geometric) points of the moduli spaces correspond to $G$-covers (or extensions of $\bar\Q(T)$ with Galois group $G$) then it is expected that rational points are related to regular extensions of $\Q(T)$ with Galois group $G$.

This geometric approach, pioneered by John G. Thompson, Michael D. Fried, Gunter Malle and Wolfgang Matzat, has been key to the realization of 25 of the 26 sporadic groups as Galois groups over $\Q$ — the only remaining sporadic group left to realize being the Mathieu group M23.

== Definitions ==
=== Configuration spaces ===
Let $G$ be a finite group and $n$ be a fixed integer. A configuration is an unordered list of $n$ distincts points of $\mathbb{A}^1(\C)$. Configurations form a topological space: the configuration space $\operatorname{Conf}_n$ of $n$ points. This space is the analytification (see GAGA) of an algebraic scheme $\mathcal{U}_n$, which is the open subvariety of $\mathbb{A}^n$ obtained by removing the closed subset corresponding to the vanishing of the discriminant.

The fundamental group of the (topological) configuration space $\operatorname{Conf}_n$ is the Artin braid group $B_n$, generated by elementary braids $\sigma_1, \ldots, \sigma_{n-1}$ subject to the braid relations ($\sigma_i$ and $\sigma_j$ commute if $|i-j|>1$, and $\sigma_i \sigma_{i+1} \sigma_i = \sigma_{i+1} \sigma_i \sigma_{i+1}$). The configuration space has the homotopy type of an Eilenberg–MacLane space $K(B_n, 1)$.

=== G-covers and monodromy conjugacy classes ===
A $G$-cover of $\mathbb{P}^1_{\C}$ ramified at a configuration $\mathbf{t} \in \mathrm{Conf}_n$ is a triple $(Y, p, f)$ where $Y$ is a connected topological space, $p : Y \to \mathbb{P}^1 \smallsetminus \mathbf{t}$ is a covering map which does not extend into a cover of $\mathbb{P}^1\smallsetminus\mathbf{t'}$ where $\mathbf{t'}$ is a configuration with less than $n$ points, and $f$ is a group isomorphism $\operatorname{Aut}(Y, p) \simeq G$. Up to isomorphism, a $G$-cover is determined by its monodromy morphism, which is a conjugacy class of group homomorphisms $\pi_1(\mathbb{P}^1 \smallsetminus \mathbf{t},\, \infty) \to G$.

One may choose a generating set of the fundamental group $\pi_1(\mathbb{P}^1 \smallsetminus \mathbf{t},\, \infty)$ consisting of homotopy classes of loops $\gamma_1, \ldots, \gamma_n$, each rotating once counterclockwise around each branch point, and satisfying the relation $\gamma_1 \cdots \gamma_n = 1$. Such a choice induces a correspondence between $G$-covers and conjugacy classes of tuples $(g_1, \ldots, g_n) \in G^n$ satisfying $g_1 \cdots g_n = 1$ and such that $g_1, \ldots, g_n$ generate $G$: here, $g_i$ is the image of the loop $\gamma_i$ under the monodromy morphism.

The conjugacy classes of $G$ containing the elements $g_1, \ldots, g_n$ do not depend on the choice of the loops $\gamma_i$. They are the monodromy conjugacy classes of a given $G$-cover. We denote by $V_n$ the set of $n$-tuples $(g_1, \ldots, g_n)$ of elements of $G$ satisfying $g_1 \cdots g_n = 1$ and generating $G$. If $\mathbf{c} = (c_1, \ldots, c_n)$ is a list of conjugacy classes of $G$, then $V_n^{\mathbf{c}}$ is the set of such tuples with the additional constraint $g_i \in c_i$.

=== Hurwitz spaces ===
Topologically, the Hurwitz space classifying $G$-covers with $n$ branch points is an unramified cover of the configuration space $\operatorname{Conf}_n$ whose fiber above a configuration $\mathbf{t}$ is in bijection, via the choice of a generating set of loops in $\pi_1(\mathbb{P}^1 \smallsetminus \mathbf{t},\, \infty)$, with the quotient $V_n/G$ of $V_n$ by the conjugacy action of $G$. Two points in the fiber are in the same connected component if they are represented by tuples which are in the same orbit for the action of the braid group $B_n$ induced by the following formula:
$$\sigma_i.(g_1,\ldots,g_n) = (g_1,\ldots,g_{i+1}^{g_i}, g_i, \ldots,g_n).$$

This topological space may be constructed as the Borel construction $G \,\backslash\!\!\backslash\, V_n \,/\!\!/\, B_n$: its homotopy type is given by $\widetilde{\operatorname{Conf}}_n \underset{B_n}{\times} (V_n/G)$, where $\widetilde{\operatorname{Conf}}_n$ is the universal cover $EB_n$ of the configuration space $\operatorname{Conf}_n \cong BB_n$, and the action of the braid group $B_n$ on $V_n/G$ is as above.

Using GAGA results, one shows that space is the analyfication of a complex scheme, and that scheme is shown to be obtained via extension of scalars of a $\Z\left[\frac{1}{|G|}\right]$-scheme $\mathcal{H}_{G, n}$ by a descent criterion of Weil. The scheme $\mathcal{H}_{G, n}$ is an étale cover of the algebraic configuration space $\mathcal{U}_n$. However, it is not a fine moduli space in general.

In what follows, we assume that $G$ is centerless, in which case $\mathcal{H}_{G, n}$ is a fine moduli space. Then, for any field $K$ of characteristic relatively prime to $|G|$, $K$-points of $\mathcal{H}_{G,n}$ correspond bijectively to geometrically connected $G$-covers of $\mathbb{P}^1_K$ (i.e., regular Galois extensions of $K(T)$ with Galois group $G$) which are unramified outside $n$ points. The absolute Galois group of $\Q$ acts on the $\bar\Q$-points of the scheme $\mathcal{H}_{G,n}$, and the fixed points of this action are precisely its $\Q$-points, which in this case correspond to regular extensions of $\Q(T)$ with Galois group $G$, unramified outside $n$ places.

== Applications ==
=== The rigidity method ===
If conjugacy classes $(c_1, \ldots, c_n)$ are given, the list $(c_1, \ldots, c_n)$ is rigid when there is a tuple $(g_1, \ldots, g_n) \in c_1 \times \cdots \times c_n$ unique up to conjugacy such that $g_1 \cdots g_n = 1$ and $g_1, \ldots, g_n$ generate $G$ — in other words, $V_n^{\mathbf{c}}/G$ is a singleton (see also rigid group). The conjugacy classes $c_1,\ldots,c_n$ are rational if for any element $g_i \in c_i$ and any integer $k$ relatively prime to the order of $g_i$, the element $g_i^k$ belongs to $c_i$.

Assume $G$ is a centerless group, and fix a rigid list of rational conjugacy classes $\mathbf{c} = (c_1, \ldots, c_n)$. Since the classes $c_1, \ldots, c_n$ are rational, the action of the absolute Galois group $G_{\Q}=\operatorname{Gal}(\bar\Q\mid\Q)$ on a $G$-cover with monodromy conjugacy classes $c_1,\ldots,c_n$ is (another) $G$-cover with monodromy conjugacy classes $c_1,\ldots,c_n$ (this is an application of Fried's branch cycle lemma). As a consequence, one may define a subscheme $\mathcal{H}^{\mathbf{c}}_{G, n}$ of $\mathcal{H}_{G, n}$ consisting of $G$-covers whose monodromy conjugacy classes are $c_1, \ldots, c_n$.

Take a configuration $\mathbf{t}$. If the points of this configuration are not globally rational, then the action of $G_{\Q}$ on $G$-covers ramified at $\mathbf{t}$ will not preserve the ramification locus. However, if $\mathbf{t} \in \mathcal{U}_n(\Q)$ is a configuration defined over $\Q$ (for example, all points of the configuration are in $\mathbf{A}^1(\Q)$), then a $G$-cover branched at $\mathbf{t}$ is mapped by an element of $G_{\Q}$ to another $G$-cover branched at $\mathbf{t}$, i.e. another element of the fiber. The fiber of $\mathcal{H}^{\mathbf{c}}_{G, n} \to \mathcal{U}_n$ above $\mathbf{t}$ is in bijection with $V_n^{\mathbf{c}}/G$, which is a singleton by the rigidity hypothesis. Hence, the single point in the fiber is necessarily invariant under the $G_{\Q}$-action, and it defines a $G$-cover defined over $\Q$.

This proves a theorem due to Thompson: if there exists a rigid list of rational conjugacy classes of $G$, and $Z(G)=1$, then $G$ is a Galois group over $\Q$. This has been applied to the Monster group, for which a rigid triple of conjugacy classes $(c_1, c_2, c_3)$ (with elements of respective orders 2, 3, and 29) exists.

Thompson's proof does not explicitly use Hurwitz spaces (this rereading is due to Fried), but more sophisticated variants of the rigidity method (used for other sporadic groups) are best understood using moduli spaces. These methods involve defining a curve inside a Hurwitz space — obtained by fixing all branch points except one — and then applying standard methods used to find rational points on algebraic curves, notably the computation of their genus using the Riemann-Hurwitz formula.

=== Statistics of extensions of function fields over finite fields ===
Several conjectures concern the asymptotical distribution of field extensions of a given base field as the discriminant gets larger. Such conjectures include the Cohen-Lenstra heuristics and the Malle conjecture.

When the base field is a function field over a finite field $\mathbb{F}_q(T)$, where $q = p^r$ and $p$ does not divide the order of the group $G$, the count of extensions of $\mathbb{F}_q(T)$ with Galois group $G$ is linked with the count of $\mathbb{F}_q$-points on Hurwitz spaces. This approach was highlighted by works of Jordan Ellenberg, Akshay Venkatesh, Craig Westerland and TriThang Tran. Their strategy to count $\mathbb{F}_q$-points on Hurwitz spaces, for large values of $q$, is to compute the homology of the Hurwitz spaces, which reduces to purely topological questions (approached with combinatorial means), and to use the Grothendieck trace formula and Deligne's estimations of eigenvalues of Frobenius (as explained in the article about Weil conjectures).

== See also ==
- Deformation theory
- Moduli space and Moduli space of curves
- Configuration space
- Inverse Galois theory
- Hilbert's irreducibility theorem
- Dessin d'enfant
- Grothendieck–Teichmüller group
