= Field arithmetic =

In mathematics, field arithmetic is a subject that studies the interrelations between arithmetic properties of a field and its absolute Galois group. It is an interdisciplinary subject as it uses tools from algebraic number theory, arithmetic geometry, algebraic geometry, model theory, the theory of finite groups and of profinite groups.

== Fields with finite absolute Galois groups ==
Let K be a field and let G = Gal(K) be its absolute Galois group. If K is algebraically closed, then G = 1. If K = R is the real numbers, then

$$G=\operatorname{Gal}(\mathbf{C}/\mathbf{R})=\mathbf{Z}/2 \mathbf{Z}.$$

Here C is the field of complex numbers and Z is the ring of integer numbers. A theorem of Artin and Schreier asserts that (essentially) these are all the possibilities for finite absolute Galois groups.

Artin–Schreier theorem. Let K be a field whose absolute Galois group G is finite. Then either K is separably closed and G is trivial or K is real closed and G = Z/2Z.

== Fields that are defined by their absolute Galois groups ==
Some profinite groups occur as the absolute Galois group of non-isomorphic fields. A first example for this is

$$\hat{\mathbf{Z}}=\lim_{\longleftarrow}\mathbf{Z}/n \mathbf{Z}.$$

This group is isomorphic to the absolute Galois group of an arbitrary finite field. Also the absolute Galois group of the field of formal Laurent series C((t)) over the complex numbers is isomorphic to that group.

To get another example, we bring below two non-isomorphic fields whose absolute Galois groups are free (that is free profinite group).

- Let C be an algebraically closed field and x a variable. Then Gal(C(x)) is free of rank equal to the cardinality of C. (This result is due to Adrien Douady for 0 characteristic and has its origins in Riemann's existence theorem. For a field of arbitrary characteristic it is due to David Harbater and Florian Pop, and was also proved later by Dan Haran and Moshe Jarden.)
- The absolute Galois group Gal(Q) (where Q are the rational numbers) is compact, and hence equipped with a normalized Haar measure. For a Galois automorphism s (that is an element in Gal(Q)) let N_{s} be the maximal Galois extension of Q that s fixes. Then with probability 1 the absolute Galois group Gal(N_{s}) is free of countable rank. (This result is due to Moshe Jarden.)

In contrast to the above examples, if the fields in question are finitely generated over Q, Florian Pop proves that an isomorphism of the absolute Galois groups yields an isomorphism of the fields:

Theorem. Let K, L be finitely generated fields over Q and let a: Gal(K) → Gal(L) be an isomorphism. Then there exists a unique isomorphism of the algebraic closures, b: K_{alg} → L_{alg}, that induces a.

This generalizes an earlier work of Jürgen Neukirch and Koji Uchida on number fields.

== Pseudo algebraically closed fields ==
A pseudo algebraically closed field (in short PAC) K is a field satisfying the following geometric property. Each absolutely irreducible algebraic variety V defined over K has a K-rational point.

Over PAC fields there is a firm link between arithmetic properties of the field and group theoretic properties of its absolute Galois group. A nice theorem in this spirit connects Hilbertian fields with ω-free fields (K is ω-free if any embedding problem for K is properly solvable).

Theorem. Let K be a PAC field. Then K is Hilbertian if and only if K is ω-free.

Peter Roquette proved the right-to-left direction of this theorem and conjectured the opposite direction. Michael Fried and Helmut Völklein applied algebraic topology and complex analysis to establish Roquette's conjecture in characteristic zero. Later Pop proved the Theorem for arbitrary characteristic by developing "rigid patching".
