= Moshe Jarden =

Israeli mathematician

- משה ירדן
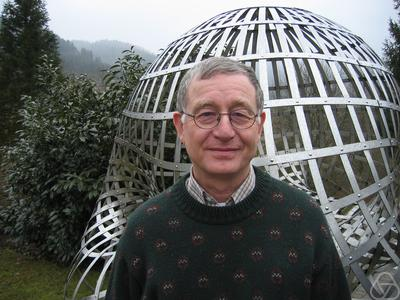
- Moshe Jarden at the Oberwolfach Research Institute for Mathematics, 2006
- Born: 23 August 1942 (age 83); Tel Aviv, Israel
- Known for: Field arithmetics, notably ample fields
- Awards: Landau prize, L. Meithner-A.v. Humboldt Prize
- Scientific career
- Fields: Mathematics
- Institutions: Tel Aviv University
- Doctoral advisor: Prof. H. Furstenberg

Moshe Jarden (Hebrew: משה ירדן) is an Israeli mathematician specializing in field arithmetic.

== Biography ==
Moshe Jarden was born in 1942 in Tel Aviv. His father, Dr. Dov Jarden (1911–1986), was a mathematician, writer and linguist, who transmitted him his love to mathematics. In 1970 he received his Ph.D. in mathematics from the Hebrew University of Jerusalem, with Hillel Furstenberg as his thesis advisor. He accomplished his postdoctorate during 1971–1973 at the Institut of Mathematics, Heidelberg University, with Peter Roquette as his mentor, and habilitated there in 1972. During these years in Heidelberg, he initiated an intense and long-term cooperation with German mathematicians, especially with Peter Roquette, Wulf-Dieter Geyer, Gerhard Frey, and Juergen Ritter. His achievements in mathematics, as well as the foundation of this fruitful cooperation with German mathematicians, earned him the L. Meithner-A.v.Humboldt Prize by the Alexander von Humboldt Foundation in 2001. In 1974, Moshe Jarden returned to Israel, and joined the School of Mathematics of Tel Aviv University. He became a full professor in 1982, and the incumbent of the Cissie and Aaron Beare chair in Algebra and Number Theory in 1998. One of his great achievements is the publication of the book "Field Arithmetic" in the series Ergebnisse der Mathematik und ihrer Grenzgebiete of Springer, which earned him the Landau Prize.

== Work ==
The main contribution of Moshe Jarden in algebra, and in mathematics in general, is his research on families of large algebraic extensions of Hilbertian fields (in particular global fields), parametrized by the automorphisms of the absolute Galois group of the base field. Notable results in this domain are the zero theorem, the transfer theorem, the free generators theorem, the Frey-Jarden theorem about the rank of algebraic varieties over large algebraic fields, Geyer-Jarden theorem about torsion points on elliptic curves over large algebraic fields, and the strong approximation theorem over such fields.

The remarkable development of Galois theory over a class of large fields, called ample fields, is described in the second book of Jarden: Algebraic Patching.

== Field arithmetic ==
In 1979, Moshe Jarden came to Irvine and met Michael D. Fried. This was during this visit that Fried suggested to write a joint book on the topics they had worked about so far, and proposed the name "Field arithmetic".

This book, where Diophantine fields are explored through their absolute Galois groups, was influential in the domain of field theory. Owing to this work, the intense activity of Moshe Jarden, and his influence on his colleagues, "Field Arithmetic" has become a recognized name of a branch of algebra, with its own classification number (12E30 Field Arithmetic). The impact of this book can also be measured by the number of open problems presented in the first and second editions (twenty two), which were mostly solved between the publication of the first and third editions.

In 1987, Moshe Jarden won the Landau Prize for the publication of "Field Arithmetic". Some years after the release of the first edition, it was realized that the term "field arithmetic" had already been coined by the mathematician Paulo Ribenboim somewhat earlier, who had published a book in French named "L'Arithmétique des Corps".

== Awards and honors ==
He was awarded the Landau prize for the book "Field Arithmetic" in 1987, and the L. Meithner-A.v.Humboldt Prize in 2001 for his achievements in mathematics.

== Selected articles ==
- Moshe Jarden, Elementary statements over large algebraic fields, Transactions of the American Mathematical Society 164 (1972), 67-91.
- Gerhard Frey and Moshe Jarden, Approximation theory and the rank of abelian varieties over large algebraic fields, Proceedings of the London Mathematical Society 28 (1974), 112-128.
- M. Jarden, Algebraic extensions of finite corank of Hilbertian fields, Israel Journal of Mathematics 18 (1974), 279-307.
- W.-D. Geyer and M. Jarden, Torsion points of elliptic curves over large algebraic extensions of finitely generated fields, Israel Journal of Mathematics 31 (1978), 157-197.
- M. Jarden and U. Kiehne, The elementary theory of algebraic fields of finite corank, Inventiones Mathematicae 30 (1975), 275-294.
- M. Fried, D. Haran, and M. Jarden, Galois stratification over Frobenius fields, Advances in Mathematics, 51 (1984), 1-35.
- D. Haran and M. Jarden, The absolute Galois group of a pseudo p-adically closed field, Journal für die reine und angewandte Mathematik 383 (1988), 147-206.
- W.-D. Geyer and M. Jarden, On stable fields in positive characteristic, Geometriae Dedicata 29 (1989), 335-375.
- M. Jarden, Large normal extensions of Hilbertian fields, Mathematische Zeitschrift 224 (1997), 555-565.
- D. Haran and M. Jarden, Regular split embedding problems over complete valued fields, Forum Mathematicum 10 (1998), 329-351.
- D. Haran, M. Jarden, and F. Pop, The absolute Galois group of subfields of the field of totally S-adic numbers, Functiones et Approximatio Commentarii Mathematici, 46 (2012), 205-223.
- M. Jarden, Diamonds in torsion of Abelian varieties, Journal of the Institute of Mathematics Jussieu 9 (2010), 477-480.
Complete list

A. Published.

1. Dov Jarden and Moshe Jarden, On the existence of an infinitude of composite primitive divisors of second order recurring sequences, The Fibonacci Quarterly 6 (1968), 322-334.
2. Moshe Jarden, Rational points on algebraic varieties over large number fields, Bulletin of the American Mathematical Society 75 (1969), 603-606.
3. Moshe Jarden, Elementary statements over large algebraic fields, Transactions of the American Mathematical Society 164 (1972), 67-91.
4. Moshe Jarden, Realization of finite groups over function fields, Journal of Algebra 24 (1973), 154-158.
5. Moshe Jarden, An injective rational map of an abstract algebraic variety into itself, Crelle Journal 265 (1974), 23-30.
6. Gerhard Frey and Moshe Jarden, Approximation theory and the rank of abelian varieties over large algebraic fields, Proceedings of the London Mathematical Society 28 (1974), 112-128.
7. Moshe Jarden, Algebraic extensions of finite corank of Hilbertian fields, Israel Journal of Mathematics 18 (1974), 279-307.
8. Moshe Jarden, On Ĉebotarev sets, Archiv der Mathematik 25 (1974), 495-497.
9. Wulf-Dieter Geyer and Moshe Jarden, Fields with the density property, Journal of Algebra 35 (1975), 178-189.
10. Moshe Jarden, On ideal theory in high Prüfer domains, Manuscripta Math. 14 (1975), 303-336.
11. Moshe Jarden, Roots of unity over large algebraic fields, Mathematische Annalen 213 (1975), 109-127.
12. Moshe Jarden and Ursel Kiehne, The elementary theory of algebraic fields of finite corank, Inventiones Mathematicae 30 (1975), 275-294.
13. Moshe Jarden, Algebraically closed fields with distinguished subfields, Archiv der Mathematik 27 (1976), 502-505.
14. Michael Fried and Moshe Jarden, Stable extensions with the global density property, Canadian Journal of Mathematics 28 (1976), 774-787.
15. Moshe Jarden, The elementary theory of 𝝎-free Ax fields, Inventiones mathematicae 38 (1976), 187-206.
16. Wulf-Dieter Geyer and Moshe Jarden, Torsion points of elliptic curves over large algebraic extensions of finitely generated fields, Israel Journal of Mathematics 31 (1978), 157-197.
17. Michael Fried and Moshe Jarden, Diophantine properties of subfields of ͠$\mathbb{Q}$, American Journal of Mathematics 100 (1978), 653-666.
18. Moshe Jarden, Intersections of conjugate fields of finite corank over Hilbertian fields, Journal of London Mathematical Society(2) 17 (1978), 393-396.
19. Moshe Jarden and Jürgen Ritter, On the characterization of local fields by their absolute Galois groups, Journal of Number Theory 11 (1979), 1-13.
20. Moshe Jarden, An analogue of Artin-Schreier Theorem, Mathematische Annalen 242 (1979), 193-200.
21. Moshe Jarden, Torsion in linear groups over large algebraic fields, Archiv der Mathematik 32 (1979), 445-451.
22. Moshe Jarden, An analogue of Ĉebotarev density theorem for fields of finite corank, Journal of Mathematics Kyoto University 20 (1980), 141-147.
23. Moshe Jarden and Peter Roquette, The Nullstellensatz over p-adically closed fields, Journal of the Mathematical Society Japan 32 (1980), 425-460.
24. Moshe Jarden, Normal automorphisms of free profinite groups, Journal of Algebra 62 (1980), 118-123.
25. Moshe Jarden and Jürgen Ritter, Normal automorphism of absolute Galois groups of p-adic fields, Duke Mathematical Journal, 47 (1980),47-56.
26. Moshe Jarden, Transfer principles for finite and p-adic fields, Nieuw Archief fur Wisskunde, (3) 28 (1980), 139-158.
27. Dan Haran and Moshe Jarden, Bounded statements in the theory of algebraically closed fields with distinguished automorphisms, Journal für die reine und ungewandte Mathematik 337 (1982), 1-17.
28. Moshe Jarden, The elementary theory of large e-fold ordered fields, Acta mathematic 149 (1982), 239-260.
29. Moshe Jarden, Torsion-free profinite groups with open free subgroups, Archiv der Mathematik 39 (1982), 496-500.
30. Moshe Jarden, The Ĉebotarev density theorem for function fields; an elementary approach, Mathematische Annalen 261 (1982), 467-475.
31. Moshe Jarden and William H. Wheeler, Model-complete theories of e-free Ax fields, Journal of Symbolic Logic, 48 (1983), 1125-1129.
32. Moshe Jarden and Jürgen Ritter, On irreducible tame representations of the absolute Galois extension of a local field and symplectic-type extensions of Qp, Illinois Journal of Mathematics 27 (1983), 14-30.
33. Jan Denef, Moshe Jarden and D.J. Lewis, On Ax-fields which are Ci, Quarterly Journal of Mathematics (2), 34 (1983), 21-36.
34. Moshe Jarden, The elementary theory of normal Frobenius fields, Michigan Mathematical Journal 30 (1983), 155-163.
35. Moshe Jarden, On the model companion of the theory of e-fold ordered fields, Acta mathematic 150 (1983), 243-253.
36. Moshe Jarden and Saharon Shelah, Pseudo algebraically closed fields over rational function fields, Proceedings of the American Mathematical Society 87, (1983), 223-228.
37. Michael Fried, Dan Haran and Moshe Jarden, Galois stratification over Frobenius fields, Advances in Mathematics, 51 (1984), 1-35.
38. Marcel Jacobson and Moshe Jarden, On torsion of abelian varieties over large algebraic extensions of finitely generated fields, Mathematika 31 (1984), 110-116.
39. Dan Haran and Moshe Jarden, Real free groups and the absolute Galois group of R(t), Journal of pure and applied algebra, 37 (1985), 155-165.
40. Dan Haran and Moshe Jarden, The absolute Galois group of a pseudo real closed field, Annali della Scuola Normale Superiore | Pisa, Serie IV, 12 (1985), 449-489.
41. Greg Cherlin and Moshe Jarden, Undecidability of some elementary theories over PAC fields, Annals of pure and applied logic 30 (1986), 137-163.
42. Dan Haran and Moshe Jarden, The absolute Galois group of a pseudo real closed algebraic field, Pacific Journal of Mathematics 123 (1986), 55-69.
43. Dan Haran and Moshe Jarden, The absolute Galois group of a pseudo p-adically closed field, Journal für die reine und angewandte Mathematik 383 (1988), 147-206.
44. Moshe Jarden, The algebraic nature of the elementary theory of PRC fields, manuscripta mathematicae 60 (1988), 463-475.
45. Wulf-Dieter Geyer and Moshe Jarden, On the normalizer of finitely generated subgroups of absolute Galois groups of uncountable Hilbertian fields of characteristic 0, Israel Journal of Mathematics 63 (1988), 323-334.
46. Wulf-Dieter Geyer and Moshe Jarden, On stable fields in positive characteristic, Geometria Dedicata 29 (1989), 335-375.
47. Moshe Jarden and Gopal Prasad, The discriminant quotients formula for global fields, Appendix to Gopal Prasad's paper \Finiteness theorems for discrete subgroups of bounded covolume in semi-simple groups", Publication Mathematique IHES 69 (1989), 115-116.
48. Ido Efrat and Moshe Jarden, Free pseudo p-adically closed fields of finite corank, Journal of Algebra 133 (1990), 132-150.
49. Moshe Jarden, Intersection of local algebraic extensions of a Hilbertian field, in Generators and Relations in Groups and Geometries (edited by Barlotti and all.), NATO ASI Series C 333 343-405, Kluwer, Dordrecht 1991.
50. Moshe Jarden, Algebraic realization of p-adically projective groups, Compositio Mathematica 79 (1991), 21-62.
51. Wulf-Dieter Geyer and Moshe Jarden, The p-adic closure of a PpC field, Abhandlungen aus dem Mathematischen Seminar der Universität Hamburg n61 (1991), 63-71.
52. Moshe Jarden and Jurgen Ritter, On the Frattini subgroup of the absolute Galois group of a local field, Israel Journal of Mathematics n74 (1991), 81-90.
53. Dan Haran and Moshe Jarden, Compositum of Galois extensions of Hilbertian fields, Annales Scientifiques de l'Ecole Normale Superieure (4) 24 (1991), 739-748.
54. Moshe Jarden and Alexander Lubotzky, Hilbertian fields and free profinite groups, Journal of the London Mathematical Society (2) 46 (1992), 205-227.
55. M. Fried, D. Haran, M. Jarden, Effective counting of the points of definable sets over finite fields, Israel Journal of Mathematics 85 (1994), 103-133.
56. Moshe jarden, The inverse Galois problem over formal power series fields, Israel Journal of Mathematics 85 (1994), 263-275.
57. M. Jarden, Algebraic dimension over Frobenius fields, Forum Mathematicum 6 (1994), 43-63.
58. M. Jarden and A. Razon, Pseudo algebraically closed fields over rings, Israel Journal of Mathematics 86 (1994), 25-59.
59. M. Jarden, Prosolvable subgroups of free products of profinite groups, Communications of Algebra 22 (1994), 1467-1494.
60. M. Jarden, On free profinite groups of uncountable rank, Contemporary Mathematics 186 (1995), 371-383
61. M. Jarden and A. Razon, Skolem density problems over algebraic PAC fields over rings Nieuw Archief voor Wiskunde 13 (1995), 381-399.
62. M. Jarden, Large normal extensions of Hilbertian fields Mathematische Zeitschrift 224 (1997), 555-565.
63. M. Jarden and A. Razon, Rumely's local global principle for algebraic PSC fields over rings, Transactions of the American Mathematical Society 350 (1998), 55-85.
64. Dan Haran and M. Jarden, Regular split embedding problems over complete valued fields, Forum Mathematicum 10 (1998), 329-351.
65. W.-D. Geyer and M. Jarden, Bounded realization of l-groups over global fields, Nagoya Mathematical Journal 150 (1998), 13-62.
66. Dan Haran and Moshe Jarden, Regular split embedding problems over function fields of one variable over ample fields, Journal of Algebra 208 (1998), 147-164.
67. M. D. Fried and M. Jarden, On Σ-Hilbertian fields, Pacific Journal of Mathematics 185 (1998), 307-313.
68. Moshe Jarden and Alexander Lubotzky, Random normal subgroups of free profinite groups, Journal of Group Theory 2 (1999), 213-224.
69. Moshe Jarden, The projectivity of the fundamental group of an affine line, The Turkish Journal of Mathematics 23 (1999), 531-547.
70. M. Jarden and A. Razon, Skolem density problems over large Galois extensions of global fields, Contemporary Mathematics 270 (2000), 213-235.
71. D. Haran and M. Jarden The absolute Galois group of C(x), Pacific Journal of Mathematics 196 (2000), 445-459.
72. M. Jacobson and M. Jarden, Finiteness theorems for torsion of abelian varieties over large algebraic fields Acta Arithmetica 98 (2001), 15-31.
73. W.-D. Geyer and M. Jarden, Non-PAC fields whose Henselian closures are separably closed, Mathematical Research Letters 8 (2001), 509-519.
74. Wulf-Dieter Geyer and Moshe Jarden, PSC Galois extensions of Hilbertian fields, Mathematische Nachrichten 236 (2002), 119-160.
75. M. Jarden, Ample fields, Archiv der Mathematik 80 (2003), 475-477.
76. D. Haran and M. Jarden, Relatively projective groups as absolute Galois groups, "Progress in Galois Theory", edts. H. Voelklein and T. Shaska, in "Progress in Galois Theory", eds. H. Voelklein and T. Shaska, pp. 87–1000, Springer Science, 2005.
77. W.-D. Geyer and M. Jarden, Torsion of Abelian varieties over large algebraic fields, Finite Field Theory and its Applications 11 (2005), 123-150.
78. G. Frey and M. Jarden, Horizontal isogeny theorems, Forum Mathematicum 14 (2002), 931-952.
79. D. Haran, M. Jarden, and F. Pop, P-Adically projective groups as absolute Galois groups, IMRN 32 (2005), 1957-1995.
80. G. Frey and M. Jarden, On the number of elliptic curves with CM over large algebraic fields, Annales de l'Institut Fourier 55 (2005), 2361–2374.
81. W.-D. Geyer and M. Jarden, The rank of Abelian varieties over large algebraic fields, Archiv der Mathematik 86, (2006), 211–216.
82. M. Jarden, A Karrass-Solitar theorem for profinite groups, Journal of Group theory 9 (2006), 139-146.
83. M. Jarden, The rank of Abelian varieties over large Galois extensions of Hilbertian fields, Appendix to S. Petersen's paper "On a question of Frey and Jarden about the rank of Abelian varieties", Journal of Number Theory 120 (2006), 287-302.
84. M. Jarden, PAC fields over number fields, Journal de Theorie des Nombres de Bordeaux 18 (2006), 371-377.
85. M. Jarden and W. Narkiewicz, On sums of units, Monatshefte für Mathematik 150 (2007), 327-332.
86. D. Haran, M. Jarden, and F. Pop, Projective group structures as absolute Galois structures with block approximation, Memoirs of the American Mathematical Society 189 (2007), 1-56.
87. D. Haran and M. Jarden, The absolute Galois groups of finite extensions of R(t), Archiv der Mathematik 89 (2007), 524-529.
88. D. Haran and M. Jarden, Regular lifting of covers over ample fields, Albanian Journal of Mathematics 1 (2007), 215-224.
89. M. Jarden and C. Videla, Undecidability of families of rings of totally real integers, International Journal of Number Theory 4 (2008), 835-850.
90. L. Bary-Soroker and M. Jarden, PAC fields over finitely generated fields, Mathematische Zeitschrift 260 (2008), 329-334.
91. M. Jarden and A. Lubotzky, Elementary equivalence of profinite groups, Bulletin of the London Mathematical Society
92. M. Jarden and A. Razon, Rumely's local global principle for weakly PSC fields over holomorphy domains, Functiones et Approximatio XXXIX (2008), 19–47.
93. The absolute Galois group of the field of totally S-adic numbers, Nagoya Mathematical Journal 194 (2009), 91-147.
94. M. Jarden and F. Pop, Function fields of one Variable over PAC Fields, Documenta Mathematica 14 (2009) 517–523.
95. M. Jarden, Diamonds in torsion of Abelian varieties, Journal of the Institute of Mathematics Jussieu 9 (2010), 477-480.
96. M. Jarden, Almost locally free fields Journal of Algebra 335 (2011), 171-176.
97. D. Haran, M. Jarden, and F. Pop, The absolute Galois group of subfields of the fields of totally S-adic number, Functiones et Approximatio Commentarii Mathematici 46 (2012), 205-223.
98. M. Jarden and E. Paran, Galois theory over integral Tate domains, New York Journal of Mathematics, http://nyjm.albany.edu/j/2012/18-21.html
99. A. Fehm, M. Jarden, and S. Petersen, Kuykian fields Forum Mathematicum 24 (2012), 1013–1022
100. W.-D. Geyer and M. Jarden, Model completeness of valued PAC fields, Travaux Mathématiques 23 (2013), 173–214.
101. D. Haran, M. Jarden, and F. Pop, The block approximation theorem, Okayama Journal of Mathematics 55 (2013), 53-85.

B. Accepted for publication

1. M. Jarden and L. Bary-Soroker, On the Bateman-Horn conjecture about polynomial rings, Münster Journal of Mathematics
2. M. Jarden and C. Videla, Fields on the bottom Journal de Théorie des Nombres de Bordeaux

== See also ==
- Absolute Galois group
