= Diamond theorem =

In mathematics, diamond theorem may refer to:

- Aztec diamond theorem on tilings
- Diamond isomorphism theorem on modular lattices
- Haran's diamond theorem on Hilbertian fields
- Second Isomorphism Theorem for Groups
- Cullinane diamond theorem on the Galois geometry of graphic patterns

== See also ==
- Diamond (disambiguation)
