= Semiabelian group =

Added a basic definition in group theory and algebra

Semiabelian groups are a class of groups first introduced by Thompson (1984) and named by Matzat (1987). It appears in Galois theory, in the study of the inverse Galois problem or the embedding problem which is a generalization of the former.

== Definition ==
Definition: A finite group G is called semiabelian if and only if there exists a sequence

$G_0 = \{1\}, G_1, \dots , G_n = G$

such that $G_i$ is a homomorphic image of a semidirect product $A_i\rtimes G_{i-1}$ with a finite abelian group $A_{i}$ ($i = 1, \dots , n$.).

The family $\mathcal{S}$ of finite semiabelian groups is the minimal family which contains the trivial group and is closed under the following operations:

- If $G \in \mathcal{S}$ acts on a finite abelian group $A$, then $A\rtimes G\in \mathcal{S}$;
- If $G\in \mathcal{S}$ and $N\triangleleft G$ is a normal subgroup, then $G/N\in \mathcal{S}$.

The class of finite groups G with a regular realizations over $\mathbb{Q}$ is closed under taking semidirect products with abelian kernels, and it is also closed under quotients. The class $\mathcal{S}$ is the smallest class of finite groups that have both of these closure properties as mentioned above.

== Example ==
- Abelian groups, dihedral groups, and all p-groups of order less than $64$ are semiabelian.
- The following are equivalent for a non-trivial finite group G (Dentzer 1995, Theorem 2.3.):
  (i) G is semiabelian.
  (ii) G possess an abelian $A\triangleleft G$ and a some proper semiabelian subgroup U with $G = AU$.

Therefore G is an epimorphism of a split group extension with abelian kernel.

- Finite semiabelian groups possess G-realizations over function fields $k(t)$ in one variable for any field $k$ and therefore are Galois groups over every Hilbertian field.
