= Semiabelian =

Semiabelian may refer to:

- Semiabelian group, in Galois theory
- Semiabelian variety, in algebraic geometry
- Semi-abelian category, in category theory
