= Haridwar Singh =

Indian scientist (1944–2017)

Haridwar Singh (born 31 March 1944, Varanasi, Uttar Pradesh, India) was an Indian scientist. He was director of the High Energy Materials Research Laboratory (HEMRL), Defence Research and Development Organisation (DRDO), Ministry of Defence, from 1990 to 2004.

Dr. Singh died on 4 November 2017.

== Biography ==
Singh was a scientist who researched energetic materials and the development of indigenous technologies for many varieties of solid rocket propellants like DBP (Double Base Propellant), nitramine base, fuel-rich propellants, and propellants based on new oxidizers. He also researched energetic binders and technologies for powerful and thermally stable high explosives as well as pyrotechnic smokes.

He found ways to extend the life of propulsion systems of advanced missiles, which resulted in financial savings for his country.

His contributions include the development of energetic low vulnerability gun propellants, Explosive Reactive Armour (ERA) technology, Fuel Air Explosive (FAE), Thermo-baric explosive technology, and CCCT (Combustible Cartridge Case Technology).

He initiated and monitored many research programs in the area of high energy materials, especially propellants and explosives for rockets, missiles and pyrotechnics. Scientific achievements under his leadership include the development and transfer of technologies of high energy propellants for various applications including propellant technology of a class of LOw Vulnerability Ammunition (LOVA) for tank guns, development of explosive reactive armour, Combustible Cartridge Case Technology, High Explosive compositions for different types of warheads, non-smoky RDX-based propellants for booster and sustainer applications etc. He has contributed to Indian research on life extension of propulsion system of missiles.

Singh was a close scientific advisor to the 11th president of India, Dr. APJ Abdul Kalam, and several Indian Prime Ministers.

== Education ==
Year	Degree
1966	Master's degree (M.Sc. organic chemistry) Gyanpur University, Uttar Pradesh, India.
1981	Ph.D., Solid Rocket Propellant Combustion, University of Pune, India.
1986	Postdoctoral research, Max-Planck Institute, Göttingen, Germany.
2007	D.Sc. (h.c) degree, Banaras Hindu University (BHU), Varanasi, India.

== Awards ==
Year	Award
1983	Scientist of the Year, conferred by the Government of India, for development of indigenous technology for manufacture of rocket propellants and for designing a single monolithic grain with two different compositions of varying ballistics.
1993	Scientist of the Year, conferred by the Government of India, for contributions in the area of science and technology of High Energy Materials and his work for life prediction of advanced solid propellants.
1994	Astronautical Society of India (ASI), conferred by the Government of India, award for recognition of contribution to rocket and related technologies.
1998	Agni award For Excellence in Self-Reliance, conferred by the Government of India, for contribution of products and technologies which have been transferred to ordnance factories and private sector for bulk production.
2003	Technology Leadership Award, conferred by the Government of India, in recognition of contributions in the field of solid rocket propellants, Commercial Explosives, High Energy Materials and Armaments.
2004	Rising Personality of India Award, conferred by Government of India.
2004	Certificate of Excellence for Outstanding and Extra Ordinary achievements, conferred by the Government of India, in "chosen field of activity and services rendered to promote greater friendship and India-International co-operation".

== Patents ==
Singh has 18 patents to his credit.

== Books authored ==
Singh has been the first author of three books:

1. Science & technology of Solid Rocket Propellants, in Hindi.

Singh is the first Indian to have written a book on Rocket Propellants in Hindi.

This book was awarded by the Ministry of Human Resource Development, for original work done in the national language for Science & Technology.

2. Science & technology of Solid Rocket Propellants, in English.

3. High Energy Materials, in English.

== Publications in national and international journals ==
Singh has authored 181 research publications and 17 technical reports.

== National & International Professional Associations ==
=== International ===
Germany: The Max-Planck Institute, Visiting Scientist.

U.S.A: High Pressure Combustion Laboratory, Pennsylvania State University, Visiting Scientist.

Delaware University, Visiting Scientist.

University of Arizona, Visiting Scientist.

United States Army Research Laboratory, Maryland, Visiting Scientist.

Science Application Centre, Santa Clara, Visiting Scientist.

Sandia National Laboratories, Livermore, Visiting Scientist.

American Institute of Aeronautics (AIAA), Lifetime Member.

American Chemical Society (ACS), Lifetime Member.

Russia: Russian Academy of Aeronautics, Honorary Member.

Israel: Dr. Singh received the Lady Davis Fellowship and served as "Visiting Professor" at the Israel Institute of Technology (IIT), Haifa from 2004 to 2010.

China: Nanjing University of Science and Technology, China, Visiting Professor.

Australia: Australian Institute of High Energy Materials. Honorary Member,

=== National ===
India: Chairman of High Energy Material Society of India (HEMSI).

Senate member of University of Pune.

Fellow of the Deccan Education Society.

Member of Science Journal Editorial Executive Board.

Central University, Hyderabad, Visiting Professor.

DIAT, Pune, Visiting Professor.

Dr. Singh was on the Board of Directors of several private sector companies and a consultant in the area of Industrial Chemistry, High Energy Materials & Management.
