= Howard Chertkow =

Canadian neurologist (b. 1955)

- Born: August 28, 1955 (age 71); Saskatoon, Saskatchewan, Canada
- Citizenship: Canadian
- Education: Western University (pre med, M.D.); McGill University, F.R.C.P.
- Children: 3
- Scientific career
- Fields: Neuroscience, cognitive neurology
- Workplaces: Baycrest, University of Toronto, Jewish General Hospital

Dr. Howard Chertkow, M.D., FRCP, FCAHS (fellow of the Canadian Academy of Health Sciences) is a leading Canadian neurologist and cognitive neuroscientist specializing in Alzheimer's disease and related dementias, who is on Stanford University's 2020 list of "Top 2% Cited Scientists", and is an elected member of the Canadian Academy of Health Sciences.

He is a professor of neurology (Dept of Medicine) at the University of Toronto. Chertkow is also Scientific Director of the Canadian Consortium on Neurodegeneration in Aging (CCNA) — a Canadian national research initiative that unites over 350 researchers studying prevention, diagnosis, and treatment of neurodegenerative diseases.

His research has focused on:

- Early detection and diagnosis of Alzheimer's and mild cognitive impairment.
- Language and memory changes in aging and dementia.
- Innovative cognitive testing and biomarkers to identify Alzheimer's symptoms before they become severe.
- Neuromodulation treatment with transcranial direct current stimulation.
- Prevention of dementia with lifestyle and medication interventions

Chertkow holds the following positions:

- Chair In Cognitive Neurology and Innovation at Baycrest
- Director, Kimel Family Centre for Brain Health and Wellness
- Director, Bank Centre for Clinical Research Trials at Baycrest
- Senior Scientist, Rotman Research Institute

== Early life and education ==
Chertkow was born and raised in Saskatoon, Saskatchewan, and London, Ontario, Canada. He attended undergraduate and medical school at London's Western University, and then undertook training in Internal Medicine at Toronto Western Hospital.

== Career ==
Chertkow initially took an academic position in the Dept. of Neurology and Neurosurgery at McGill, rising to full Professor in the department. Dr. Chertkow practiced cognitive neurology at the Jewish General Hospital (JGH) in Montreal from 1989 to 2018. There he founded with Dr. Howard Bergman the JGH Memory Clinic, a large multidisciplinary outpatient clinic where new concepts of early diagnosis and the Montreal Cognitive Assessment were developed and validated. He served as Director of the Jewish General Hospital (JGH) Bloomfield Centre for Research in Aging (1999–2014) and was a Senior Investigator in the Lady Davis Institute for Medical Research.

His areas of research interest include: early diagnosis of Alzheimer's disease and prediction of deterioration in individuals with mild cognitive impairment (MCI); the structure, organization, and function of the semantic memory component of long-term memory, and its deterioration in dementia; localization of language and memory functions in the brain using functional imaging; therapy of cognitive disorders in Alzheimer's disease and frontotemporal dementia using neuromodulation approaches; prevention of dementia with lifestyle interventions and combination therapy.

In 2005, Chertkow was senior and corresponding author for the publication of the MoCA, the Montreal Cognitive Assessment, which was largely developed and validated in his Jewish General Hospital memory clinic, and has become a standard assessment tool for Mild Cognitive Impairment around the world. The MoCA paper is the most cited publication in the world in the domain of Neurology in the 21st century.

Chertkow has been primary investigator and Scientific Director for the Canadian Consortium on Neurodegeneration in Aging (CCNA) since its formation in 2014. Funded by the Canadian Ministry of Health through its medical funding agency the CIHR (Canadian Institutes of Health Research), specifically its Institute of Aging, the CCNA. CCNA, with over 300 Canadian dementia researchers, has been organized into 19 teams, supported by four national platforms and multiple cross-cutting programs. As Scientific Director of this $111 million (2014–29) national effort, he has become a leader of the Canadian dementia research community. This national effort has catalyzed research on AD across the country and brought Canadian researchers together to develop interdisciplinary projects and teams. It has focussed on basic, clinical, as well as translational research to discover the mechanisms by which disease causes neurodegeneration and how to modify neurodegenerative diseases and improve the quality of life of individuals living with dementia. A national cohort of 1100 individuals with various forms of dementia (COMPASS-ND) has been created and is being followed longitudinally. Another group of 100 researchers has organized a national dementia prevention research program. CCNA, which has published over 600 papers, is a major development in dementia research in Canada and has had a high impact on dementia research.

Chertkow has served as national president of the Consortium of Canadian Centres for Clinical Cognitive Research (C5R) (2000–2004), and executive member (elected) of ISTAART (Alzheimer's Association International Society to Advance Alzheimer's Research and Treatment (ISTAART), the professional society for individuals interested in Alzheimer's and dementia science).

Chertkow's McGill lab was among the first to describe in detail the semantic loss which has come to be accepted as a fundamental aspect of the neuropsychology of AD.

He has been a key national and international researcher in promulgating diagnostic concepts and bringing them to the medical community. He was the only Canadian on the NIA-AA committee developing NIA guidelines for dementia and AD. He also chaired and co-chaired the Canadian Third and Fourth dementia Consensus Conferences.

Chertkow joined Baycrest, the Baycrest Academy of Research and Education, and the University of Toronto in 2018, as the chair in Cognitive Neurology and Innovation, a Senior Scientist at Baycrest's Rotman Research Institute, and a professor in University of Toronto's Department of Medicine.

His lab at Baycrest has been active in developing transcranial direct current stimulation (tDCS) neuromodulation for cognitive therapy of AD and FTD. With colleague Dr. Tyler Roncero at Baycrest, his has been one of the first labs to show that tDCS can produce clinically meaningful improvement in anomia and language in Primary Progressive Aphasia and various dementias, and potentially can benefit other cognitive domains.

Chertkow is inaugural scientific director of the Kimel Family Centre for Brain Health and Wellness, a Baycrest interdisciplinary program focused on developing and evaluating approaches to preventing cognitive decline.

Chertkow also developed and leads a state-of-the-art clinical trials unit, as inaugural Director of The Baycrest Anne and Allan Bank Centre for Clinical Research Trials. The centre received the Consortium of Canadian Centres for Clinical Cognitive Research (C5R) Award of Excellence as the highest enrolling site in Canada for dementia clinical trials (July 2024 – June 2025) for the second year in a row. This centre has further developed Baycrest's translational research program in dementia to test the latest emerging therapies for Alzheimer's disease and related conditions.

== Personal life ==
Chertkow is married and lives in Toronto. He has three daughters.
