= Adolf Hurwitz =

German mathematician (1859–1919)

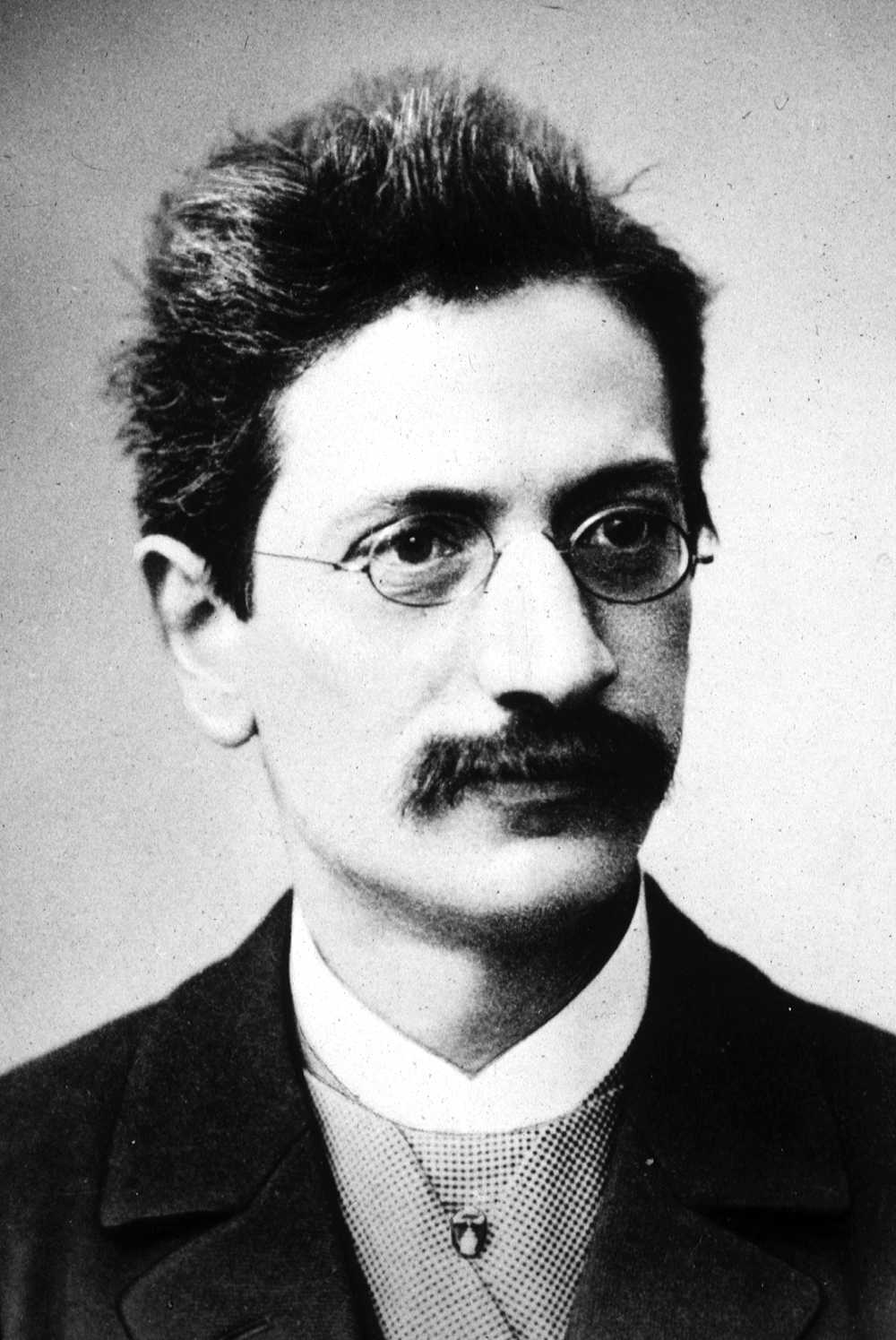
- Born: 26 March 1859; Hildesheim, Kingdom of Hanover (now part of Germany)
- Died: 18 November 1919 (aged 60); Zurich, Switzerland
- Education: Leipzig University
- Known for: Riemann–Hurwitz formula Hurwitz quaternion
- Scientific career
- Fields: Mathematician
- Workplaces: Federal Polytechnic Institute Zurich; Albertus Universität Königsberg
- Doctoral advisor: Felix Klein
- Doctoral students: Ernst Amberg; L. Gustave du Pasquier

Adolf Hurwitz (German: [ˈaːdɔlf ˈhʊʁvɪts]; 26 March 1859 – 18 November 1919) was a German mathematician who worked on algebra, analysis, geometry and number theory.

== Early life ==
He was born in Hildesheim, then part of the Kingdom of Hanover, to a Jewish family and died in Zurich, Switzerland. His father Salomon Hurwitz, a merchant, was not wealthy. Hurwitz's mother, Elise Wertheimer, died when he was three years old. Family records indicate that he had siblings and cousins, but their names have yet to be confirmed except for an older brother, Julius, with whom he developed an arithmetical theory for complex continued fractions circa 1890. Hurwitz entered the Realgymnasium Andreanum in Hildesheim in 1868. He was taught mathematics there by Hermann Schubert. Schubert persuaded Hurwitz's father to allow him to attend university, and arranged for Hurwitz to study with Felix Klein at the Ludwig-Maximilians-Universität München. Salomon Hurwitz could not afford to send his son to university, but his friend, Mr. Edwards, assisted financially.

== Educational career ==
Hurwitz entered the Ludwig-Maximilians-Universität München in 1877 at 18 years of age. He spent one year there attending lectures by Klein, before spending the academic year 1877–1878 at the Friedrich Wilhelm University of Berlin where he attended classes by Kummer, Weierstrass and Kronecker, after which he returned to the Ludwig-Maximilians-Universität München.

In October 1880, Felix Klein moved to Leipzig University. Hurwitz followed him there, and became a doctoral student under Klein's direction, finishing a dissertation on elliptic modular functions in 1881. Following two years at the University of Göttingen, in 1884 he was invited to become an Extraordinary Professor at the Albertus Universität Königsberg; there he encountered the young David Hilbert and Hermann Minkowski, on whom he had a major influence. Following the departure of Frobenius, Hurwitz took a chair at the Eidgenössische Polytechnikum Zürich (today ETH Zurich) in 1892 (having to turn down a position at Göttingen shortly after), and remained there for the rest of his life.

Throughout his time in Zurich, Hurwitz was in continual ill health, which had been originally caused when he contracted typhoid while a student in Munich. He had severe migraines, and in 1905 developed kidney disease, resulting in one being removed.

== Contributions to mathematics ==
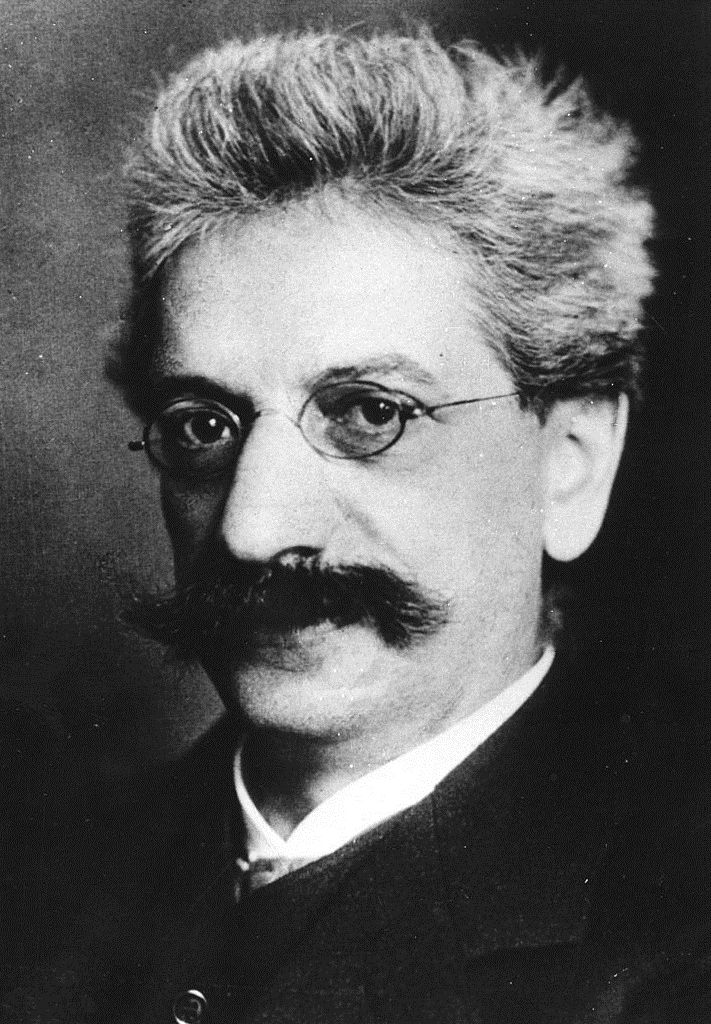
Adolf Hurwitz

He was one of the early students of the Riemann surface theory, and used it to prove many of the foundational results on algebraic curves; for instance Hurwitz's automorphisms theorem. This work anticipates a number of later theories, such as the general theory of algebraic correspondences, Hecke operators, and Lefschetz fixed-point theorem. He also had deep interests in number theory. He studied the maximal order theory (as it now would be) for the quaternions, defining the Hurwitz quaternions that are now named for him. In the field of control systems and dynamical systems theory he derived the Routh–Hurwitz stability criterion for determining whether a linear system is stable in 1895, independently of Edward John Routh who had derived it earlier by a different method. In Lie theory, Hurwitz proved the existence of the Haar measure on Lie groups (which Haar then extended to locally compact groups).

== Family ==
In 1884, while at Königsberg, Hurwitz met and married Ida Samuel, the daughter of a professor in the faculty of medicine. They had three children.

== Selected publications ==
- Hurwitz, A., 1898. Ueber die Composition der quadratischen Formen von beliebig vielen Variablen. Nachrichten von der Gesellschaft der Wissenschaften zu Göttingen, Mathematisch-Physikalische Klasse, 1898, pp. 309–316.
- Vorlesungen über allgemeine Funktionentheorie und elliptische Funktionen (= Die Grundlehren der mathematischen Wissenschaften in Einzeldarstellungen mit besonderer Berücksichtigung der Anwendungsgebiete. vol. 3, ISSN 0072-7830). Edited and supplemented by a section on geometric Funktionentheorie by Richard Courant. Springer, Berlin 1922 (4th, extended and edition with an appendix by Helmut Röhrl, ibid 1964, online text)
- Mathematische Werke. Published by the Department of Mathematics and Physics of the Eidgenössischen Technischen Hochschule in Zürich. 2 vols. Birkhäuser, Basel 1932–1933 (with a memoir on Hurwitz by Ernst Meissner)
- Übungen zur Zahlentheorie. 1891–1918 (= Schriftenreihe der ETH-Bibliothek. vol. 32, ZDB-ID 504558-7). Translated by Barbara Aquilino. As a duplicated manuscript edited by Herbert Funk and Beat Glaus. ETH-Bibliothek, Zürich 1993, doi:10.3929/ethz-a-001313794.
- Lectures on Number Theory. Edited for publication by Nikolaos Kritikos. Translated with some additional material (from the German) by William C. Schulz. Springer, New York 1986, ISBN 0-387-96236-0.
- Karl Weierstraß: Einleitung in die Theorie der analytischen Funktionen. Vorlesung Berlin 1878 (= Dokumente zur Geschichte der Mathematik. vol. 4). In a transcript by Adolf Hurwitz. Edited by Peter Ullrich. Vieweg, Braunschweig 1988, ISBN 3-528-06334-3.

== See also ==
- First Hurwitz triplet
- Hurwitz class number
- Hurwitz determinant
- Hurwitz-stable matrix
- Routh–Hurwitz matrix
- Hurwitz numbers
- Hurwitz polynomial
- Hurwitz problem
- Hurwitz quaternion order
- Hurwitz quaternion
- Hurwitz scheme
- Hurwitz space
- Hurwitz surface
- Hurwitz zeta function
- Hurwitz's automorphisms theorem
- Hurwitz's theorem (complex analysis)
- Hurwitz's theorem (composition algebras)
- Hurwitz's theorem (number theory)
- Radon–Hurwitz numbers
- Riemann–Hurwitz formula
