= Ernst Julius Amberg =

Swiss mathematician and mountain climer

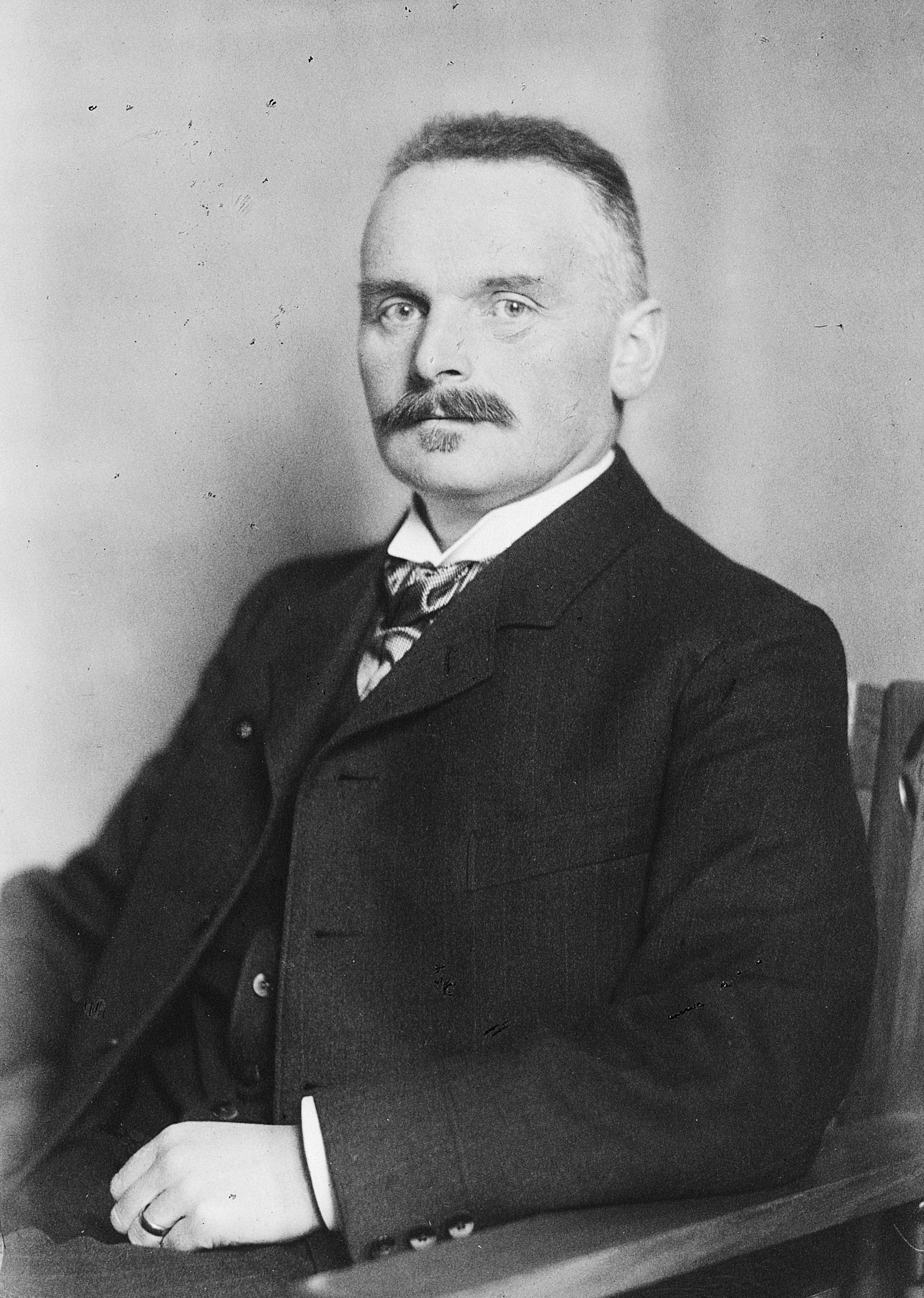
- Ernst in 1913
- Born: 6 September 1871; Zürich, Switzerland
- Died: 15 March 1952 (aged 80)
- Education: ETH Zurich; University of Zurich
- Occupations: Mathematician; mountain climber

Ernst Julius Amberg (6 September 1871 – 15 March 1952) was a Swiss mathematician and mountain climber, and also an organizer of the first International Congress of Mathematicians held in Zürich in 1897.

== Biography ==
Amberg was born on 6 September 1871 in Zürich. He studied mathematics at ETH Zurich with a Lehrerdiplom (teaching diploma) in 1894. He received his doctorate in 1897 from the University of Zurich. His dissertation, Über einen Körper, dessen Zahlen sich rational aus zwei Quadratwurzeln zusammensetzen (On a field whose elements have the form $c_0 + c_1 \sqrt{a} + c_2 \sqrt{b} + c_3 \sqrt{ab}$, where $c_0, c_1, c_2, c_3$ are rational numbers) was supervised by Adolf Hurwitz. As an assistant at ETH Zurich, Amberg was one of the members of the organizing committee of the first International Congress of Mathematicians. In May 1897, he joined a subcommittee that selected plenary speakers including Hermann Minkowski, Karl Geiser and Jérôme Franel. When Johann Jakob Rebstein (because of military service) resigned as the organizing committee's German-language secretary, Amberg replaced him.

After leaving ETH Zurich, he became a teacher at the Kantonsschule in Frauenfeld (in canton Thurgau). He was from 1903 to 1938 a mathematics teacher (as Walter Gröbli’s successor) at the Gymnasium in Zürich, as well as the Gymnasium’s director from 1916 to 1938 (when he retired).

In 1912 he also became assistant professor for mathematics and analytic geometry at the ETH, and was promoted to Titularprofessor in 1918. Furthermore, he also lectured on teaching skills for mathematics both at the ETH and at the University of Zurich. Amberg lectured at the ETH until his retirement in 1938.

During World War II, he was a substitute teacher in various Swiss Gymnasiums. In addition to his school duties, he worked as an actuary for insurance and reinsurance companies. His dissertation seems to be his only published mathematical research, although he did write about actuarial mathematics and mathematics education.

He was a keen mountaineer and headed the Zürich section of the Swiss Alpine Club for six years.

Together with Anton Züblin he was the first to climb Piz Gannaretsch (3040m) and Piz Vatgira (2983m), both in canton Grisons.

Amberg was married but had no children.
