= Days of Shame =

Hospital strike over hiring a Jewish intern

- Date: 14 June 1934 to 19 June 1934
- Location: Montreal, Quebec, Canada
- Goals: Resignation of Dr. Samuel Rabinovitch
- Methods: Strike action
- Result: Formal resignation of Dr. Samuel Rabinovitch; Increased restrictions on the admission of Jewish students into the Université de Montréal; Establishment of the Jewish General Hospital

Parties
Striking doctors and nurses Supported by: Saint-Jean-Baptiste Society; Le Devoir	Dr. Samuel Rabinovitch; Supported by: Jews of Montreal; Olivar Asselin; Edmond Turcotte

The Days of Shame was an antisemitic June 1934 doctors' strike at the Hôpital Notre-Dame in Montreal, Quebec, Canada. For four days, all interns at the hospital walked off the job to protest the hiring of a Jewish senior intern, Dr. Samuel Rabinovitch. The strike ended when Rabinovitch resigned his position.

== Background ==
Samuel Rabinovitch (1909–2010), a young physician from a family of Jewish doctors, had been the highest ranking graduate of his class from the Université de Montréal. Following his graduation, he was offered a senior internship at several hospitals in both Canada and the United States, eventually accepting the offer from Hôpital Notre-Dame in his hometown of Montreal. He was the first Jewish intern to be hired at a French Canadian hospital in history. All applications from French Canadian graduates that year were also accepted.

== Days of Shame ==
Rabinovitch's appointment was immediately met with backlash. Members of the public in Quebec sent letters to the hospital claiming that Catholics were being replaced by Jews, that the French Canadian population had been abused under the banner of tolerance, and declaring that they had a right to refuse to be treated by openly Jewish doctors. In early June 1934 a petition signed by doctors and interns of Notre-Dame was submitted to the hospitals board, requesting that the contract between the Hospital and Rabinovitch be rescinded. After a lengthy deliberation by the hospital board it was decided to uphold the contract and hire Rabinovitch.

At midnight on 14 June 1934, thirty-two resident doctors at the hospital walked off the job rather than work with Rabinovich, refusing even to treat patients in critical condition. By 17 June the strike had expanded to include interns from five other Montreal hospitals, with interns at a further three hospitals signing a petition in support of the strike, and with several hundred nurses threatening to join the strike.

Quebec nationalist groups and media such as the Saint-Jean-Baptiste Society and Le Devoir quickly backed the striking interns, with the latter publishing stories referring to Rabinovich as "the foreign physician" and alleging that he had links to "high finance." The strike also spread to target other Jewish doctors, such as Abram Stillman, a postdoctoral urologist at Hôtel-Dieu de Québec. Stillman's supervisor, Oscar Mercier, barely defended him, merely stating that he was "just a visitor" who could not be taking a job from a French Canadian as he was "not occupying an official position." Only a handful of French Canadians publicly supported Rabinovitch, notably Le Canada editors Olivar Asselin and Edmond Turcotte, who decried the antisemitic conspiracies that were spread on front-page headlines by the press.

On 18 June, after efforts from Montreal's Jewish community to solve the situation came short, Rabinovitch formally resigned from his position. His letter of resignation, which was published publicly in several newspapers, stated that he "bemoaned the fact that so many French Canadian physicians, namely graduates, should have ignored the first duty of their oath," but that the "distressing, serious and dangerous condition to which the patients of the Nôtre-Dame and other hospitals have been exposed" left him with no choice.

Following Rabinovitch's resignation, the striking doctors returned to work at 7:30 PM on 19 June 1934. None of them would face any disciplinary sanctions for their actions. On 22 June 1934, an interview with three of the strikers was published in L’Ordre in which the strikers denied being motivated by antisemitism, stating instead that they had legitimate concerns about competition between Jewish and Catholic doctors for limited internships, and about Catholic interns being forced to spend an entire year practicing alongside a Jew.

== Aftermath ==
After his resignation, Rabinovitch left Canada to take up an internship in St. Louis, Missouri, specialising in internal medicine. He would remain there until his return to Montreal in 1940. The Université de Montréal increased its restrictions on the admission of Jewish students after the Days of Shame.

The impact of the Days of Shame, along with other antisemitic events, led the Jewish community in Quebec to establish their own hospital, the Jewish General Hospital. Funds for the new hospital were obtained through charitable drives headed by Allan Bronfman, Sir Mortimer Davis and J. W. McConnell.

== See also ==
- List of incidents of civil unrest in Canada
- Timeline of labour issues and events in Canada
