= Henriette Marie Meyer =

Canadian philanthropist

Henriette Marie Meyer, Lady Davis, CBE (1872–1963) was a Jewish-Canadian philanthropist. She was known as Lady Davis after her husband, Sir Mortimer Davis, was knighted in 1917.

== Life ==
Meyer was born in San Francisco, the daughter of Charles Meyer, a banker and philanthropist. On June 12, 1898, she married wealthy Canadian businessman Mortimer B. Davis, and the couple resided in Montreal.

In 1901, she gave birth to a son, also named Mortimer Davis (1901–1940). A few years later, she adopted her nephew Philip. In 1924, Sir Mortimer and Lady Davis divorced. In the divorce settlement, she received more than a million dollars, allowing her to continue her philanthropic activities.

After her divorce, she moved to France, where she founded a resort for disabled children named the Colonie de vacances. For her actions, she received the Legion of Honour from the French government. She also helped to house refugees escaping from Nazi persecution. With the outbreak of the Second World War, she returned to Montreal, where she donated a Spitfire plane to the British Army and provided lodging for RAF pilots. For her contributions, she received the Order of the British Empire.

After the end of the war, she established the Lady Davis Foundation, which helped bring survivors of the Holocaust to Canada. In 1963, she funded the construction of several schools in Israel.

== Legacy ==
Several institutions are named for Lady Davis:

- The Lady Davis Carmel Medical Center in Haifa
- The Lady Davis Israel National Library
- The Lady Davis Institute for Medical Research at the Montreal's Jewish General Hospital
- Lady Davis School in north Tel Aviv

Lady Davis Fellows are scholars supported by her foundation.
