= L. Gustave du Pasquier =

Swiss mathematician

Louis-Gustave du Pasquier (18 August 1876, Auvernier – 31 January 1957, Cornaux) was a Swiss mathematician and historian of mathematics and mathematical sciences.

== Education and career ==
Du Pasquier studied at l'École Polytechnique, the University of Zurich, La Sorbonne, the Collège de France, and the Collège Libre des Sciences Sociales. He received his doctorate in 1906 from the University of Zurich with dissertation Zahlentheorie der Tettarionen under the supervision of Adolf Hurwitz. Du Pasquier then taught at La Chaux-de-Fonds, Kusnacht, Frauenfeld, Winterthur, and Zurich, before he became a professor at the University of Neuchâtel in 1911. Du Pasquier wrote more than 60 articles published in scientific journals. He did research on number theory, probability theory, relativity theory, astronomy, and actuarial science. He edited the 7th volume of the collected works of Leonhard Euler.

Du Pasquier was an Invited Speaker of the ICM in 1920 at Strasbourg, in 1924 at Toronto, in 1928 at Bologna, and in 1932 at Zurich.

== Books ==
- Le développement de la notion de nombre. Mémoires de l'Université de Neuchâtel.t.3. Attinger frères. 1921.
- Le principe de la relativité et les théories d'Einstein. O. Doin. 1922.
- Le calcul des probabilités, son évolution mathématique et philosophique. 1926.
- Léonard Euler et ses amis. 1927.
- as editor: Euler, Leonhard (1923). Opera omnia Series I, Opera mathematica. Volumen VII, Commentationes algebraicae. Ad theoriam combinationum et probabilitatum pertinentes. Teubner.
