= Hurwitz class number =

In mathematics, the Hurwitz class number H(N), introduced by Adolf Hurwitz, is a modification of the class number of positive definite binary quadratic forms of discriminant –N, where forms are weighted by 2/g for g the order of their automorphism group, and where H(0) = –1/12.

Zagier (1975) showed that the Hurwitz class numbers are coefficients of a mock modular form of weight 3/2.
