= Jan-Erik Lane =

Jan-Erik Lane (born 1946) is a social scientist and professor emeritus at UNIGE, with residence in Höganäs.

== Life ==
Jan-Erik Lane has taught politics and economics at many universities around the world. He has been a member of many editorial boards of political and social science journals. He has published more than 700 books and articles. In 1996 (and 2009), he received the Humboldt Award by the Humboldt Stiftung, receiving also a Lady Davis Fellowship at the Hebrew University in 2006 and also 2012, as well as honorary medals from Kairo University and the university o of Qatar. He has been full professor in 3 universities like Umea and Oslo universities and visiting professor at many more. He also taught at The University of South Pacific.
