= Yin Xiaowei =

Chinese materials scientist (1973–2019)

Yin Xiaowei (Chinese: 殷小玮; April 1973 – 26 November 2019) was a Chinese materials scientist, known for his research in composite materials. He served as Professor of Materials Science at Northwestern Polytechnical University, and Executive Vice Dean of the Graduate School of the university.

== Biography ==
Yin was born in April 1973 in Baotou, Inner Mongolia, China, with his ancestral home in Anqiu, Shandong.

He earned his bachelor's (1995), master's, and Ph.D. (2001) degrees from the Materials Science and Engineering Department of Northwestern Polytechnical University in Xi'an. In 2002, he became a postdoctoral researcher at Technion – Israel Institute of Technology, and was awarded a Lady Davis Fellowship the following year. In 2004, he was awarded a fellowship from the Alexander von Humboldt Foundation to conduct research at the University of Erlangen–Nuremberg in Germany.

In June 2006, Yin returned to China and was appointed a professor of the School of Materials Science of Northwestern Polytechnical University. In May 2015 he became Vice Dean of the school. In November 2018, he was appointed Executive Vice Dean of the Graduate School of Northwestern Polytechnical University.

Yin published 70 papers in journals included in the Science Citation Index, including 9 highly cited ones. His papers have been cited 3,100 times on SCI, with an h-index of 31. In 2016, he was awarded the Natural Science Award of the Ministry of Education of China (First Class) and the Shaanxi Provincial Natural Science Award (First Class). In 2017, he was awarded the inaugural Young Scientist Award by the Chinese Society for Composite Materials.

Yin died from an illness on 26 November 2019 in Xi'an, aged 46.
