= Haran's diamond theorem =

Sufficient condition for a separable extension of a Hilbertian field to be Hilbertian

In mathematics, the Haran diamond theorem gives a general sufficient condition for a separable extension of a Hilbertian field to be Hilbertian.

== Statement of the diamond theorem ==
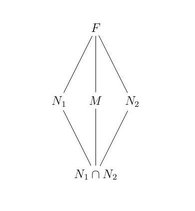
field diagram of the diamond theorem

Let K be a Hilbertian field and L a separable extension of K. Assume there exist two Galois extensions N and M of K such that L is contained in the compositum NM, but is contained in neither N nor M. Then L is Hilbertian.

The name of the theorem comes from the pictured diagram of fields, and was coined by Jarden.

== Some corollaries ==
=== Weissauer's theorem ===
This theorem was firstly proved using non-standard methods by Weissauer. It was reproved by Fried using standard methods. The latter proof led Haran to his diamond theorem.

Weissauer's theorem

Let K be a Hilbertian field, N a Galois extension of K, and L a finite proper extension of N. Then L is Hilbertian.

Proof using the diamond theorem

If L is finite over K, it is Hilbertian; hence we assume that L/K is infinite. Let x be a primitive element for L/N, i.e., L = N(x).

Let M be the Galois closure of K(x). Then all the assumptions of the diamond theorem are satisfied, hence L is Hilbertian.

=== Haran–Jarden condition ===
Another, preceding to the diamond theorem, sufficient permanence condition was given by Haran–Jarden: Theorem. Let K be a Hilbertian field and N, M two Galois extensions of K. Assume that neither contains the other. Then their compositum NM is Hilbertian.

This theorem has a very nice consequence: Since the field of rational numbers, Q is Hilbertian (Hilbert's irreducibility theorem), we get that the algebraic closure of Q is not the compositum of two proper Galois extensions.
