= Michael D. Fried =

American mathematician

Michael David Fried
- Education: University of Michigan
- Known for: inverse Galois problem
- Scientific career
- Fields: Mathematics
- Workplaces: Stony Brook University; University of California, Irvine; University of Florida; Hebrew University of Jerusalem
- Doctoral advisor: Donald John Lewis

Michael David Fried is an American mathematician working in the geometry and arithmetic of families of nonsingular projective curve covers.

== Career ==
Fried received his undergraduate degree from Michigan State University in electrical engineering and then worked for three years as an aerospace electrical engineer. He then received his PhD from University of Michigan in Mathematics in 1967 under Donald John Lewis.

He spent two years as a postdoctoral researcher at the Institute for Advanced Study (1967–1969). He was a professor at Stony Brook University (8 years), University of California, Irvine (26 years), University of Florida (3 years) and Hebrew University (2 years). He has held visiting appointments at MIT, MSRI, University of Michigan, University of Florida, Hebrew University and Tel Aviv University.

He has been an editor on several mathematics journals including the Research Announcements of the Bulletin of the American Mathematical Society, and the Journal of Finite Fields and its Applications.

== Awards ==
He was included in the inaugural (2013) class of Fellows of the American Mathematical Society. He was also a Sloan Fellow (1972–1974), Lady Davis Fellow at Hebrew University (1987–1988), Fulbright scholar at Helsinki University (1982–1983), and Alexander von Humboldt Research Fellow (1994–1996).

== See also ==
- Field arithmetic
