= Hurwitz scheme =

In algebraic geometry, the Hurwitz scheme $\mathcal{H}_{d, g}$ is the scheme parametrizing pairs ($C, \pi: C \to \mathbf{P}^1$) where C is a smooth curve of genus g and π has degree d.
