= Lady Davis Fellows =

Research grant award

The Lady Davis Fellow is a program of The Lady Davis Foundation for the scholars to carry out research in various areas on the campuses of the Hebrew University of Jerusalem and the Technion - Israel Institute of Technology in Israel. The Lady Davis Fellows are selected on the basis of demonstrated talent and promising ideas for their research. The Lady Davis Foundation also provide fellowships for visiting professors along with postdoctoral and doctoral researchers. The fellowships are initially provided for the period of one year. To date, the foundation has supported about 1700 scholars all around the world including visiting professors, postdoctoral and doctoral researchers in Science, Engineering, Arts and Literature to serve as a Lady Davis Fellow. The fellowship is named after the wife of Sir Mortimer Davis, Henriette Marie Meyer.

== Notable Fellows ==
- Lawrence D. Brown (visiting professor)
- Ofer Feldman (visiting professor)
- Richard M. Karp (visiting professor)
- Peter J. Stang (visiting professor)
- Eiichi Nakamura (chemist) (visiting professor)
- Carl M. Bender (visiting professor)
- Eric Weinstein (visiting professor)
- Norman Stillman (visiting professor)
- Kendall Houk (visiting professor)
- Samuel L. Braunstein
- Anne Bayefsky (visiting professor)
- Paul W. Franks
- Ingram Olkin (visiting professor)
- Michael D. Fried (visiting professor)
- Włodzimierz Julian Korab-Karpowicz (visiting professor)
- Paul Goldberg (geologist)
- Steven B. Bowman
- Aaron W. Hughes (visiting professor)
- Yael S. Feldman
- Joanna B. Michlic
- Mario Szegedy
- Jan-Erik Lane (visiting professor)
- Shaye J. D. Cohen (visiting professor)
- Igor Rivin (visiting professor)
- Tomek Bartoszyński (visiting professor)
- Paul Wiegmann
- Yin Xiaowei
