= Mortimer Davis =

Canadian businessman and philanthropist

Sir Mortimer Davis
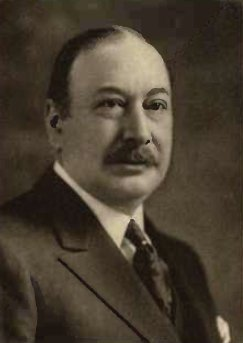
- Davis in 1920
- Born: Mortimer Barnett Davis; February 6, 1866; Montreal, Quebec, Canada
- Died: March 22, 1928 (aged 62); Cannes, France
- Occupations: Businessman, philanthropist
- Spouse(s): Henriette Marie Meyer; Eleanor Curran
- Children: 1

Sir Mortimer Barnett Davis (February 6, 1866 – March 22, 1928) was a Jewish Canadian businessman and philanthropist. The mansion that he built in Montreal's Golden Square Mile has been renamed Purvis Hall and is today owned by McGill University.

== Business career ==
Born in Montreal, Quebec, to Samuel Davis and Minnie Falk Davis, he graduated from the High School of Montreal and then joined his elder brothers Eugene Harmon and Maurice Edward in the family's cigar business, S. Davis and Sons. In 1888, S. Davis and Sons purchased another Montreal firm, D. Ritchie and Company.

In 1895, the American Tobacco Company purchased D. Ritchie and Company, as well as the American Cigarette Company, another Montreal cigarette manufacturer. Samuel Davis retired from S. Davis and Sons, and Mortimer Davis left the family firm, which remained in the hands of two of his brothers, to become president of the American Tobacco Company of Canada.

In 1902, the British-American Tobacco Company Limited was formed by the merger of the American Tobacco Company and the Imperial Tobacco Company of England. It later purchased the American Tobacco Company of Canada, which became the Imperial Tobacco Company of Canada Ltd., and Mortimer Davis was its first president. The financial power of the empire over which he presided earned him the title of "Tobacco King," which he shares with his great rival, Sir William Christopher Macdonald.

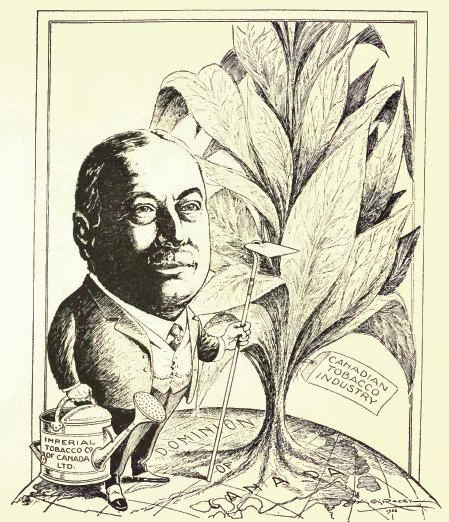
Sir Mortimer Barnett Davis from Canadian men of affairs in cartoon (1922)

In 1917, he was knighted by King George V, becoming the first Canadian-born Jew to receive such an honour.

Davis was a director of many companies, including the Union Bank, Royal Bank of Canada, Henry Corby distillery (he served as president from 1907 to 1922), Crown Trust Company, Empire Tobacco, and part of the senior management of the Nova Scotia Silver Cobalt Mining Company and the Consolidated Asbestos Mining Company. In addition, he was a member of the Montreal Board of Trade and the Montreal Stock Exchange.

== Personal life ==
On June 12, 1898, in San Francisco, Davis married Henriette Marie Meyer, daughter of Charles Meyer, a banker and philanthropist. Their only son, Mortimer Davis, junior, died in 1940.

Davis was a member of Temple Emanu-El (see Temple Emanu-El-Beth Sholom (Westmount, Quebec)), which his father had helped to establish. He underwrote the entire $420,000 of a new YMHA (see Federation CJA) building, which opened at Mount Royal, near Park Avenue, shortly after his death. He was a key force in building the Mount Sinai Sanatarium, in Préfontaine.

In 1924, Davis divorced his wife in order to marry Eleanor Curran (d. 1963). He spent many of the final years of his life at Les Glaïeuls, his villa in Cannes, where he died in 1928.

He is interred within Mount Royal Cemetery in Montreal. His former residence in the Golden Square Mile (formerly called Sir Mortimer B. Davis House) is now known as Purvis Hall, on the grounds of McGill University.

Following his death, a dispute arose about the execution of his will. His widow, who was one of the executors, and his son together sued to have the other two executors, Lord Shaughnessy and A.M. Reaper, removed on the basis of fraud. The litigation was extensive, ultimately being decided in favour of Shaugnessy and Reaper by the Judicial Committee of the Privy Council, at that time the highest court in the British Empire, including Canada.

Davis left 75% of his estate to be used for the construction of a Jewish public hospital in Montreal that would bear his name. However, he stipulated that the funds be invested for 50 years to allow them to reach a sum capable of funding a sizable hospital. And so it was that in 1978, $10 million from his estate was donated to the existing Jewish General Hospital in Montreal, which was renamed the Sir Mortimer B. Davis Jewish General Hospital.

His first wife was an active philanthropist and was made an officer of the Légion d'honneur and Commander of the Order of the British Empire. She died in 1963. The Lady Davis Institute for Medical Research, the Lady Davis Fellowship, the Lady Davis Mechanical & Aeronautical Engineering Center (a 7-storey low-rise building of the Technion in Haifa), the Lady Davis Building (the main building of the National Library of Israel in Jerusalem) and the Lady Davis Carmel Medical Center in Haifa, Israel are named in her honour.
