= Johann Jakob Rebstein =

Swiss mathematician and surveyor

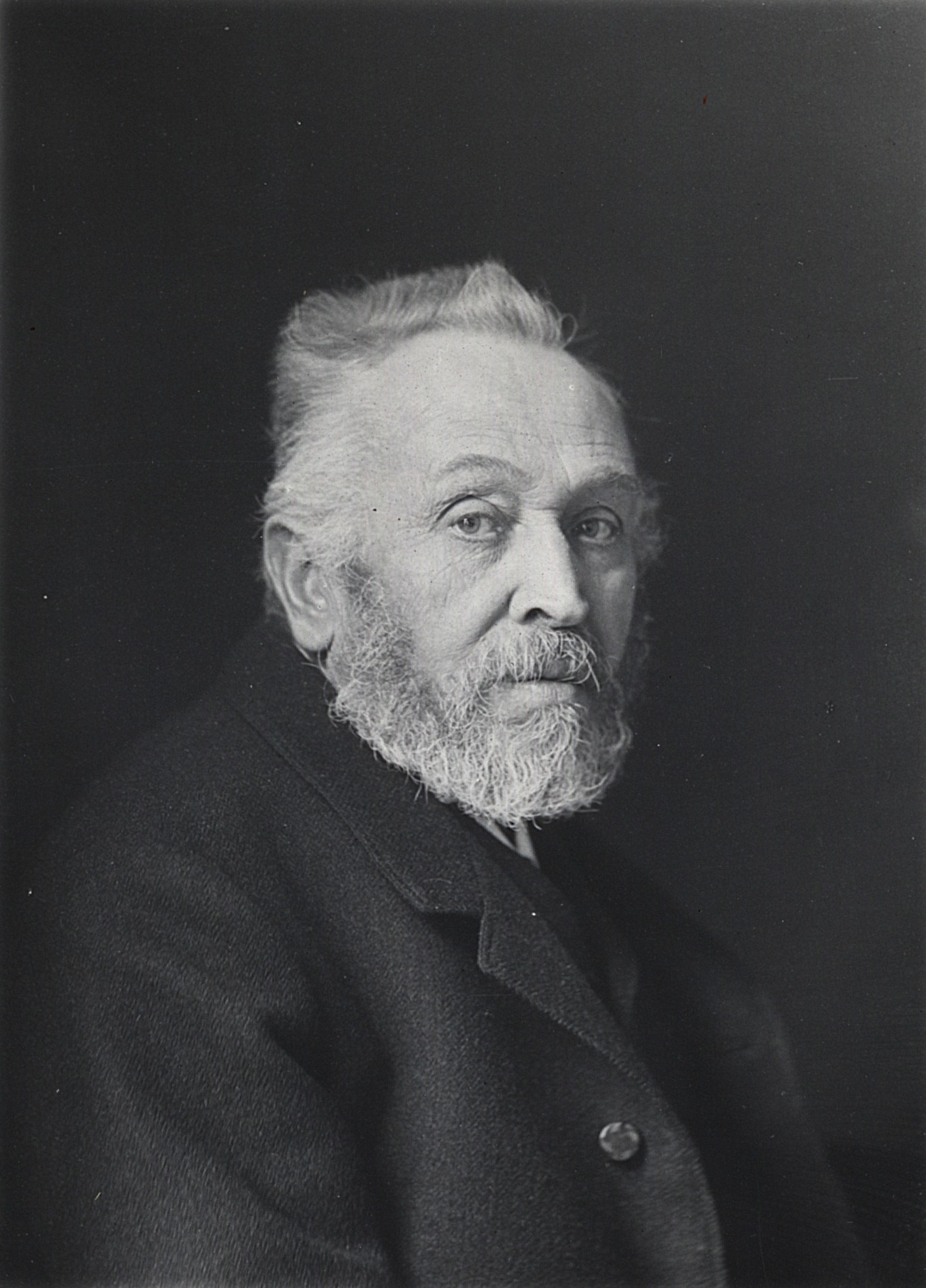
- Johann Jakob Rebstein, c. 1900
- Born: 4 May 1840; Töss, Switzerland
- Died: 14 March 1907 (aged 66); Zürich, Switzerland
- Occupation: mathematician

Johann Jakob Rebstein (1840–1907) was a Swiss mathematician and surveyor.

== Early life ==
Rebstein was born on 4 May 1840 in Töss, Switzerland, to his father, a baker and his mother, a doctor.

== Education and career ==
Rebstein attended post-secondary school in Winterthur, and after graduating in 1860, went on to study for a year at Collège de France. He was professor of mathematics and physics in Zürich from 1877 to 1898. He was awarded his doctorate in 1895 from the Humboldt University of Berlin for his work Bestimmung aller reellen Minimalflächen, die eine Schaar ebener Curven enthalten, denen auf der Gauss'schen Kugel die Meridiane entsprechen. (Note: English: Determining All Real Minimal Surfaces That Contain a Family of Planar Curves, Which Correspond to the Meridians on the Gaussian Sphere) He is best known for his work in surveying, and for introducing the traverse method in Switzerland. Throughout his career, Rebstein was appointed as surveying expert for a number of cantons, including Thurgau (1863–1881), St. Gallen (1881–1894), Zürich (1886–1892), and Luzern (1894–1907).

In 1868 he was elected to the Swiss Concordat of Geometers, and served as its president from 1887 until his death in 1907.

In 1905 he was awarded an honorary doctorate from the University of Zürich, for "outstanding contributions to actuarial sciences".

Rebstein was a member of the organizing committee for the first meeting of the International Congress of Mathematicians.

== Death ==
Rebstein suffered from kidney disease for the last several years of his life, and died in 1907 in Zürich.

== Publications ==
Rebstein's publications included:

- Lehrbuch über praktische Geometrie mit besonderer Berücksichtigung der Theodolitmessung (1868)
- Die Kartographie der Schweiz, dargestellt in ihrer historischen Entwicklung (1883)
- Mitteilungen über die Stadtvermessung von Zürich1 (1892)

== See also ==
- List of German-language philosophers
