= Embedding problem =

In Galois theory, a branch of mathematics, the embedding problem is a generalization of the inverse Galois problem. Roughly speaking, it asks whether a given Galois extension can be embedded into a Galois extension in such a way that the restriction map between the corresponding Galois groups is given.

== Definition ==
Given a field K and a finite group H, one may pose the following question (the so called inverse Galois problem). Is there a Galois extension F/K with Galois group isomorphic to H. The embedding problem is a generalization of this problem:

Let L/K be a Galois extension with Galois group G and let f : H → G be an epimorphism. Is there a Galois extension F/K with Galois group H and an embedding α : L → F fixing K under which the restriction map from the Galois group of F/K to the Galois group of L/K coincides with f?

Analogously, an embedding problem for a profinite group F consists of the following data: Two profinite groups H and G and two continuous epimorphisms φ : F → G and f : H → G. The embedding problem is said to be finite if the group H is. A solution (sometimes also called weak solution) of such an embedding problem is a continuous homomorphism γ : F → H such that φ = f γ. If the solution is surjective, it is called a proper solution.

== Properties ==
Finite embedding problems characterize profinite groups. The following theorem gives an illustration for this principle.

Theorem. Let F be a countably (topologically) generated profinite group. Then

1. F is projective if and only if any finite embedding problem for F is solvable.
2. F is free of countable rank if and only if any finite embedding problem for F is properly solvable.
