= Thin set (Serre) =

In mathematics, a thin set in the sense of Serre, named after Jean-Pierre Serre, is a certain kind of subset constructed in algebraic geometry over a given field K, by allowed operations that are in a definite sense 'unlikely'. The two fundamental ones are: solving a polynomial equation that may or may not be the case; solving within K a polynomial that does not always factorise. One is also allowed to take finite unions.

== Formulation ==
More precisely, let V be an algebraic variety over K (assumptions here are: V is an irreducible set, a quasi-projective variety, and K has characteristic zero). A type I thin set is a subset of V(K) that is not Zariski-dense. That means it lies in an algebraic set that is a finite union of algebraic varieties of dimension lower than d, the dimension of V. A type II thin set is an image of an algebraic morphism (essentially a polynomial mapping) φ, applied to the K-points of some other d-dimensional algebraic variety V′, that maps essentially onto V as a ramified covering with degree e > 1. Saying this more technically, a thin set of type II is any subset of

φ(V′(K))

where V′ satisfies the same assumptions as V and φ is generically surjective from the geometer's point of view. At the level of function fields we therefore have

[K(V): K(V′)] = e > 1.

While a typical point v of V is φ(u) with u in V′, from v lying in V(K) we can conclude typically only that the coordinates of u come from solving a degree e equation over K. The whole object of the theory of thin sets is then to understand that the solubility in question is a rare event. This reformulates in more geometric terms the classical Hilbert irreducibility theorem.

A thin set, in general, is a subset of a finite union of thin sets of types I and II .

The terminology thin may be justified by the fact that if A is a thin subset of the line over Q then the number of points of A of height at most H is ≪ H: the number of integral points of height at most H is $O\left({H^{1/2}}\right)$, and this result is best possible.

A result of S. D. Cohen, based on the large sieve method, extends this result, counting points by height function and showing, in a strong sense, that a thin set contains a low proportion of them (this is discussed at length in Serre's Lectures on the Mordell-Weil theorem). Let A be a thin set in affine n-space over Q and let N(H) denote the number of integral points of naive height at most H. Then

$$N(H) = O\left({H^{n-1/2} \log H}\right) .$$

== Hilbertian fields ==
A Hilbertian variety V over K is one for which V(K) is not thin: this is a birational invariant of V. A Hilbertian field K is one for which there exists a Hilbertian variety of positive dimension over K: the term was introduced by Lang in 1962. If K is Hilbertian then the projective line over K is Hilbertian, so this may be taken as the definition.

The rational number field Q is Hilbertian, because Hilbert's irreducibility theorem has as a corollary that the projective line over Q is Hilbertian: indeed, any algebraic number field is Hilbertian, again by the Hilbert irreducibility theorem. More generally a finite degree extension of a Hilbertian field is Hilbertian and any finitely generated infinite field is Hilbertian.

There are several results on the permanence criteria of Hilbertian fields. Notably Hilbertianity is preserved under finite separable extensions and abelian extensions. If N is a Galois extension of a Hilbertian field, then although N need not be Hilbertian itself, Weissauer's results asserts that any proper finite extension of N is Hilbertian. The most general result in this direction is Haran's diamond theorem. A discussion on these results and more appears in Fried-Jarden's Field Arithmetic.

Being Hilbertian is at the other end of the scale from being algebraically closed: the complex numbers have all sets thin, for example. They, with the other local fields (real numbers, p-adic numbers) are not Hilbertian.

== WWA property ==
The WWA property (weak 'weak approximation', sic) for a variety V over a number field is weak approximation (cf. approximation in algebraic groups), for finite sets of places of K avoiding some given finite set. For example take K = Q: it is required that V(Q) be dense in

Π V(Q_{p})

for all products over finite sets of prime numbers p, not including any of some set {p_{1}, ..., p_{M}} given once and for all. Ekedahl has proved that WWA for V implies V is Hilbertian. In fact Colliot-Thélène conjectures WWA holds for any unirational variety, which is therefore a stronger statement. This conjecture would imply a positive answer to the inverse Galois problem.
