= Peter Roquette =

German mathematician (1927–2023)

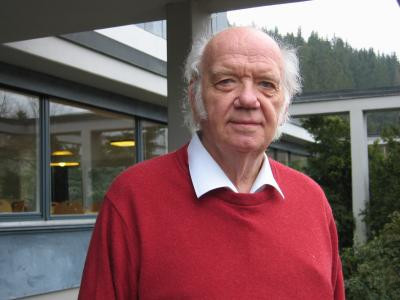
Roquette in 2006

Peter Jaques Roquette (8 October 1927 – 24 February 2023) was a German mathematician working in algebraic geometry, algebra, and number theory.

== Biography ==
Roquette was born in Königsberg on 8 October 1927. He studied at the University of Erlangen, the Humboldt University of Berlin, and the University of Hamburg. In 1951, he defended a dissertation at the University of Hamburg under Helmut Hasse, providing a new proof of the Riemann hypothesis for algebraic function fields over a finite field (the first proof was given by André Weil in 1940). From 1951 to 1952, he was an assistant at the Mathematical Research Institute at Oberwolfach and from 1952 to 1954 at the Ludwig-Maximilians-Universität München. From 1954 to 1956, he worked at the Institute for Advanced Study in Princeton. In 1954, he was Privatdozent at the Ludwig-Maximilians-Universität München, and from 1956 to 1959, he worked in the same position at the University of Hamburg. In 1959, he became an associate professor at the Saarland University and in the same year at the University of Tübingen. From 1967, he was professor at Heidelberg University, where he retired in 1996.

Roquette worked on number and function fields and especially local p-adic fields. He applied the methods of model theory (nonstandard arithmetic) in number theory, joint with Abraham Robinson, with whom he worked on Mahler's theorem (on the finiteness of integral points on a curve of genus g > 0) using non-standard methods. He authored a number of works on the history of mathematics, in particular on the schools of Helmut Hasse and Emmy Noether. In 1975, Roquette was co-editor of the collected essays by Helmut Hasse.

From 1978, Roquette was a member of the Heidelberg Academy of Sciences and from 1985, the German Academy of Sciences Leopoldina. He has an honorary doctorate from the University of Duisburg-Essen and was an honorary member of the Mathematical Society of Hamburg. In 1958, he was an invited speaker at the International Congress of Mathematicians in Edinburgh (on the topic of "Some fundamental theorems on Abelian function fields").

His doctoral students include Gerhard Frey and Volker Weispfenning.

Roquette died in Heidelberg on 24 February 2023, at the age of 95.

== Selected publications ==
- Analytic theory of elliptic functions over local fields. Vandenhoeck and Ruprecht 1970.
- With Franz Lemmermeyer (Editor): The Correspondence of Helmut Hasse and Emmy Noether 1925-1935 Göttingen State and University Library, 2006.
- with Günther Frei (Editor): Emil Artin and Helmut Hasse - correspondence 1923-1934, University of Göttingen Publisher 2008
- The Brauer-Hasse-Noether Theorem in Historical Perspective. Mathem. the-Naturwiss writings. Class of the Heidelberg Academy of Sciences, Springer-Verlag, 2005.
- Anthony V. Geramita, Paulo Ribenboim (ed.): Collected Papers of Peter Roquette 3 volumes. Queens Papers in Pure and Applied Mathematics Bd.118, Kingston, Ontario, Queen's University, 2002.
- With Alexander Prestel: Formally p-adic Fields. Lecture Notes in Mathematics, Springer-Verlag 1984.
- Robinson, A.; Roquette, P. On the finiteness theorem of Siegel and Mahler concerning Diophantine equations. J. Number Theory 7 (1975), 121–176.
