= Hilbert's irreducibility theorem =

Result in number theory, concerning irreducible polynomials

In number theory, Hilbert's irreducibility theorem, conceived by David Hilbert in 1892, states that every finite set of irreducible polynomials in a finite number of variables and having rational number coefficients admit a common specialization of a proper subset of the variables to rational numbers such that all the polynomials remain irreducible. This theorem is a prominent theorem in number theory.

== Formulation of the theorem ==
Hilbert's irreducibility theorem. Let

$$f_1(X_1, \ldots, X_r, Y_1, \ldots, Y_s), \ldots, f_n(X_1, \ldots, X_r, Y_1, \ldots, Y_s)$$

be irreducible polynomials in the ring

$$\Q(X_1, \ldots, X_r)[Y_1, \ldots, Y_s].$$

Then there exists an r-tuple of rational numbers (a_{1}, ..., a_{r}) such that

$$f_1(a_1, \ldots, a_r, Y_1,\ldots, Y_s), \ldots, f_n(a_1, \ldots, a_r, Y_1,\ldots, Y_s)$$

are irreducible in the ring

$$\Q[Y_1,\ldots, Y_s].$$

Remarks.

- It follows from the theorem that there are infinitely many r-tuples. In fact the set of all irreducible specializations, called Hilbert set, is large in many senses. For example, this set is Zariski dense in $\Q^r.$
- There are always (infinitely many) integer specializations, i.e., the assertion of the theorem holds even if we demand (a_{1}, ..., a_{r}) to be integers.
- There are many Hilbertian fields, i.e., fields satisfying Hilbert's irreducibility theorem. For example, number fields are Hilbertian.
- The irreducible specialization property stated in the theorem is the most general. There are many reductions, e.g., it suffices to take $n=r=s=1$ in the definition. A result of Bary-Soroker shows that for a field K to be Hilbertian it suffices to consider the case of $n=r=s=1$ and $f=f_1$ absolutely irreducible, that is, irreducible in the ring K^{alg}[X,Y], where K^{alg} is the algebraic closure of K.

== Applications ==
Hilbert's irreducibility theorem has numerous applications in number theory and algebra. For example:

- The inverse Galois problem, Hilbert's original motivation. The theorem almost immediately implies that if a finite group G can be realized as the Galois group of a Galois extension N of

$$E=\Q(X_1, \ldots, X_r),$$

then it can be specialized to a Galois extension N_{0} of the rational numbers with G as its Galois group. (To see this, choose a monic irreducible polynomial f(X_{1}, ..., X_{n}, Y) whose root generates N over E. If f(a_{1}, ..., a_{n}, Y) is irreducible for some a_{i}, then a root of it will generate the asserted N_{0}.)

- Construction of elliptic curves with large rank.
- Hilbert's irreducibility theorem is used as a step in the Andrew Wiles proof of Fermat's Last Theorem.
- If a polynomial $g(x) \in \Z[x]$ is a perfect square for all large integer values of x, then g(x) is the square of a polynomial in $\Z[x].$ This follows from Hilbert's irreducibility theorem with $n=r=s=1$ and

$$f_1(X, Y) = Y^2 - g(X).$$

(More elementary proofs exist.) The same result is true when "square" is replaced by "cube", "fourth power", etc.

== Generalizations ==
It has been reformulated and generalized extensively, by using the language of algebraic geometry. See thin set (Serre).
