= Jewish General Hospital =

Hospital in Quebec, Canada phone number of records department

Sir Mortimer B. Davis Jewish General Hospital Hôpital général juif Sir Mortimer B. Davis
- CIUSSS du Centre-Ouest-de-l’Île-de-Montréal

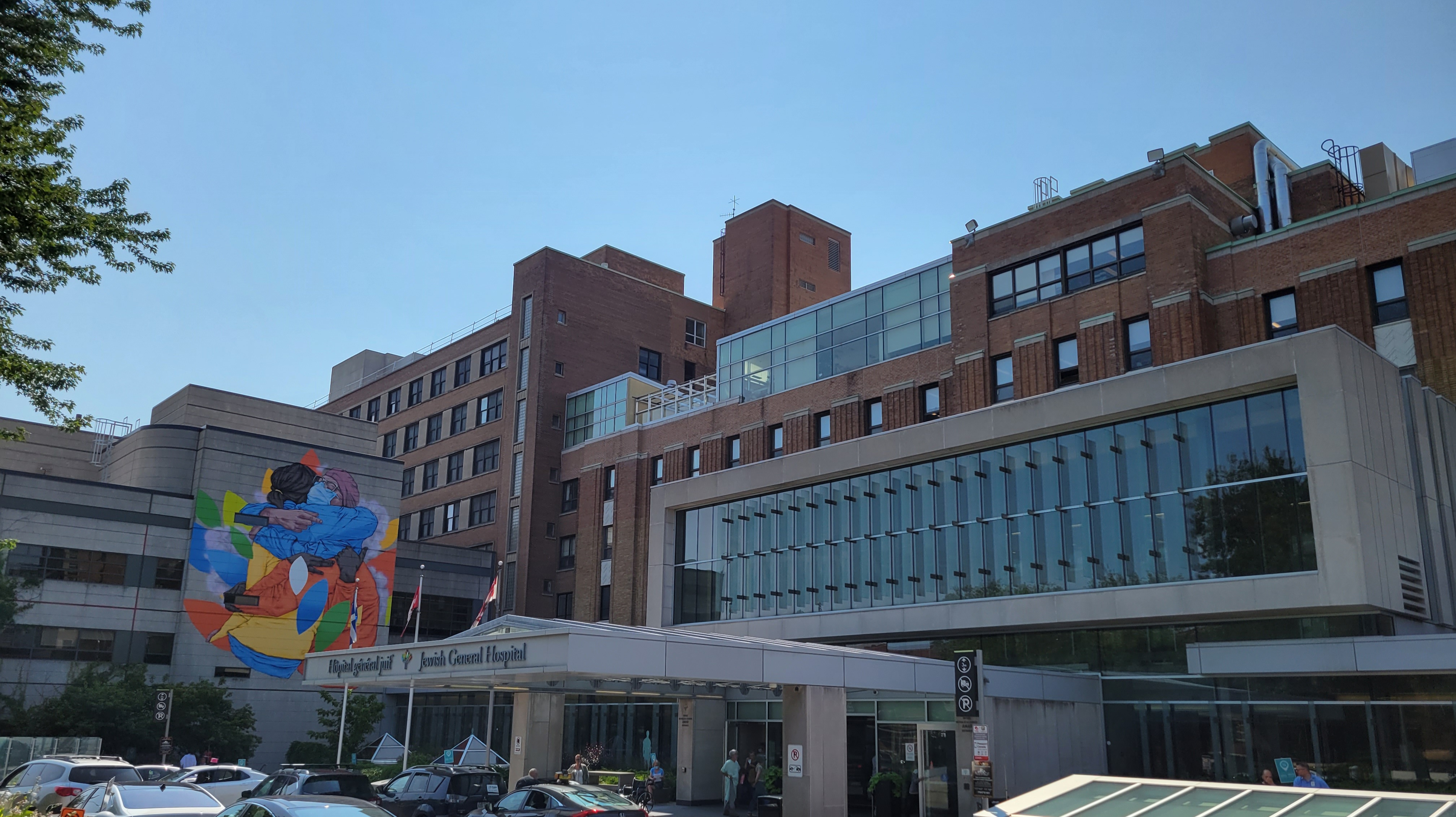
- The entrance along Côte-Sainte-Catherine Road

- Location in Montreal

Geography
- Location: 3755, chemin de la Côte-Sainte-Catherine; Montreal, Quebec, Canada
- Coordinates: 45.498°N 73.629°W

Organization
- Care system: RAMQ (Quebec Health Insurance Board)
- Type: District General, Teaching
- Affiliated university: McGill University Faculty of Medicine

Services
- Emergency department: Level II trauma centre
- Beds: 637

History
- Constructed: 1928, 1932, 1950, 1953, 2005 and 2014.
- Founded: 1934

Links
- Website: www.jgh.ca

Sir Mortimer B. Davis Jewish General Hospital (French: Hôpital général juif Sir Mortimer B. Davis), commonly known as the Jewish General Hospital (JGH; French: Hôpital général juif), is an acute-care teaching hospital in Montreal, Quebec, Canada. Affiliated with McGill University, the hospital has 637 beds, making it one of the largest hospital sites in Canada.

In 2019, Newsweek ranked the hospital 4th in Canada and 1st in Quebec.

== History ==
At his death in 1928, Sir Mortimer Davis left most of his estate to fund the construction of a Jewish public hospital that would bear his name.

The Jewish General Hospital was built in 1931–1932 and opened in 1934. It was founded as a general hospital open to all comers. The Jewish community established it in part as a response to the anti-Semitic "Days of Shame" doctors' strike at the Hôpital Notre-Dame in Montreal, Quebec, Canada, where all interns walked off the job for four days to protest the hiring of a Jewish senior intern, Dr. Samuel Rabinovitch. They returned to work only after Dr. Rabinovitch resigned. While part of Quebec's Medicare system and bilingual, the hospital continues to be run primarily by members of the Jewish community.

In 1950, the hospital was enlarged with the addition of Pavilion A, followed by further expansion in 1953 with Pavilions C and D. In 1969, the hospital opened the affiliated Lady Davis Institute for Medical Research, one of the largest and most influential research centres in Canada. Among its many innovations, in 1974, JGH became one of the first in Canada to establish a division of colorectal surgery. Notable alumni include former head nurse Beverley Binder (née Rosen).

In 1978, fifty years after Davis's death, $10 million more from his estate was donated to the hospital, which was then renamed the Sir Mortimer B. Davis Jewish General Hospital. Expansion continued into the 21st century, with Pavilion E added in 2005 and Pavilion K completed in 2014. In 2016, the hospital opened a new pavilion as part of a $430-million expansion and renovation project. Two years later, the provincial government of Quebec committed $200 million towards a multi-year renovation project.

== Lady Davis Institute for Medical Research ==
The Lady Davis Institute for Medical Research (LDI) is the hospital's research arm, and maintains strong academic ties to McGill University.

Founded in 1969, LDI is a leading North American biomedical research institute with nearly 200 researchers. Its scientists have made significant breakthroughs in the fields of HIV/AIDS, aging, cancer, vascular disease, epidemiology, and psychosocial science.

The LDI currently supports four major research axes (or programs):

- Cancer (Segal Cancer Centre)
- Epidemiology
- Molecular and Regenerative Medicine (including stem cells, haemovascular disease, aging, and HIV/AIDS)
- Psychosocial Aspects of Disease

== See also ==
- McGill University Health Centre (MUHC)
- The Ride to Conquer Cancer
