= Inverse Galois problem =

Unsolved problem in mathematics

Unsolved problem in mathematics
Is every finite group the Galois group of a Galois extension of the rational numbers?
More unsolved problems in mathematics

In Galois theory, the inverse Galois problem concerns whether or not every finite group appears as the Galois group of some Galois extension of the rational numbers $\mathbb{Q}$. This problem, first posed in the early 19th century, is unsolved.

There are some permutation groups for which generic polynomials are known, which define all algebraic extensions of $\mathbb{Q}$ having a particular group as Galois group. These groups include all of degree no greater than 5. There also are groups known not to have generic polynomials, such as the cyclic group of order 8.

More generally, let G be a given finite group, and K a field. If there is a Galois extension field L/K whose Galois group is isomorphic to G, one says that G is realizable over K.

== Partial results ==
Many cases are known. It is known that every finite group is realizable over any function field in one variable over the complex numbers $\mathbb{C}$, and more generally over function fields in one variable over any algebraically closed field of characteristic zero. Igor Shafarevich showed that every finite solvable group is realizable over $\mathbb{Q}$. It is also known that every simple sporadic group is realizable over $\mathbb{Q}$.

David Hilbert showed that this question is related to a rationality question for G:

If K is any extension of $\mathbb{Q}$ on which G acts as an automorphism group, and the invariant field K^{G} is rational over $\mathbb{Q}$, then G is realizable over $\mathbb{Q}$.

Here rational means that it is a purely transcendental extension of $\mathbb{Q}$, generated by an algebraically independent set. This criterion can for example be used to show that all the symmetric groups are realizable.

Much detailed work has been carried out on the question, which is in no sense solved in general. Some of this is based on constructing G geometrically as a Galois covering of the projective line: in algebraic terms, starting with an extension of the field $\mathbb{Q}(t)$ of rational functions in an indeterminate t. After that, one applies Hilbert's irreducibility theorem to specialise t, in such a way as to preserve the Galois group.

All 4,953 transitive permutation groups of degree 23 or less are known to be realizable over $\mathbb{Q}$.

There are 25,000 distinct transitive permutation groups of degree $n=24$. As of June 2026, only 286 of them have been shown to be realizable over $\mathbb{Q}$.

All 13 non-abelian simple groups smaller than PSL(2,25) (order 7800) are known to be realizable over $\mathbb{Q}$.

== A simple example: cyclic groups ==
It is possible, using classical results, to construct explicitly a polynomial whose Galois group over $\mathbb{Q}$ is the cyclic group Z/nZ for any positive integer n. To do this, choose a prime p such that p ≡ 1 (mod n); this is possible by Dirichlet's theorem. Let Q(μ) be the cyclotomic extension of $\mathbb{Q}$ generated by μ, where μ is a primitive p-th root of unity; the Galois group of Q(μ)/Q is cyclic of order p − 1.

Since n divides p − 1, the Galois group has a cyclic subgroup H of order (p − 1)/n. The fundamental theorem of Galois theory implies that the corresponding fixed field, F = Q(μ)^{H}, has Galois group Z/nZ over $\mathbb{Q}$. By taking appropriate sums of conjugates of μ, following the construction of Gaussian periods, one can find an element α of F that generates F over $\mathbb{Q}$, and compute its minimal polynomial.

This method can be extended to cover all finite abelian groups, since every such group appears in fact as a quotient of the Galois group of some cyclotomic extension of $\mathbb{Q}$. (This statement should not though be confused with the Kronecker–Weber theorem, which lies significantly deeper.)

=== Worked example: the cyclic group of order three ===
For n = 3, we may take p = 7. Then Gal(Q(μ)/Q) is cyclic of order six. Let us take the generator η of this group which sends μ to μ^{3}. We are interested in the subgroup H = {1, η^{3}} of order two. Consider the element α = μ + η^{3}(μ). By construction, α is fixed by H, and only has three conjugates over $\mathbb{Q}$:

α = η^{0}(α) = μ + μ^{6},
β = η^{1}(α) = μ^{3} + μ^{4},
γ = η^{2}(α) = μ^{2} + μ^{5}.

Using the identity:

1 + μ + μ^{2} + ⋯ + μ^{6} = 0,

one finds that

α + β + γ = −1,
αβ + βγ + γα = −2,
αβγ = 1.

Therefore α is a root of the polynomial

(x − α)(x − β)(x − γ) = x^{3} + x^{2} − 2x − 1,

which consequently has Galois group Z/3Z over $\mathbb{Q}$.

== Symmetric and alternating groups ==
Hilbert showed that all symmetric and alternating groups are represented as Galois groups of polynomials with rational coefficients.

The polynomial x^{n} + ax + b has discriminant

$$(-1)^{\frac{n(n-1)}{2}} \!\left( n^n b^{n-1} + (-1)^{1-n} (n-1)^{n-1} a^n \right)\!.$$

We take the special case

f(x, s) = x^{n} − sx − s.

Substituting a prime integer for s in f(x, s) gives a polynomial (called a specialization of f(x, s)) that by Eisenstein's criterion is irreducible. Then f(x, s) must be irreducible over $\mathbb{Q}(s)$. Furthermore, f(x, s) can be written

$$x^n - \tfrac{x}{2} - \tfrac{1}{2} - \left( s - \tfrac{1}{2} \right)\!(x+1)$$

and f(x, 1/2) can be factored to:

$$\tfrac{1}{2} (x-1)\!\left( 1+ 2x + 2x^2 + \cdots + 2 x^{n-1} \right)$$

whose second factor is irreducible (but not by Eisenstein's criterion). Only the reciprocal polynomial is irreducible by Eisenstein's criterion. We have now shown that the group Gal(f(x, s)/Q(s)) is doubly transitive.

We can then find that this Galois group has a transposition. Use the scaling (1 − n)x = ny to get

$$y^n - \left \{ s \left ( \frac{1-n}{n} \right )^{n-1} \right \} y - \left \{ s \left ( \frac{1-n}{n} \right )^n \right \}$$

and with

$$t = \frac{s (1-n)^{n-1}}{n^n},$$

we arrive at:

g(y, t) = y^{n} − nty + (n − 1)t

which can be arranged to

y^{n} − y − (n − 1)(y − 1) + (t − 1)(−ny + n − 1).

Then g(y, 1) has 1 as a double zero and its other n − 2 zeros are simple, and a transposition in Gal(f(x, s)/Q(s)) is implied. Any finite doubly transitive permutation group containing a transposition is a full symmetric group.

Hilbert's irreducibility theorem then implies that an infinite set of rational numbers give specializations of f(x, t) whose Galois groups are S_{n} over the rational field $\mathbb{Q}$. In fact this set of rational numbers is dense in $\mathbb{Q}$.

The discriminant of g(y, t) equals

$$(-1)^{\frac{n(n-1)}{2}} n^n (n-1)^{n-1} t^{n-1} (1-t),$$

and this is not in general a perfect square.

=== Alternating groups ===
Solutions for alternating groups must be handled differently for odd and even degrees.

==== Odd degree ====
Let

$$t = 1 - (-1)^{\tfrac{n(n-1)}{2}} n u^2$$

Under this substitution the discriminant of g(y, t) equals

$$\begin{align}
(-1)^{\frac{n(n-1)}{2}} n^n (n-1)^{n-1} t^{n-1} (1-t)
&= (-1)^{\frac{n(n-1)}{2}} n^n (n-1)^{n-1} t^{n-1} \left (1 - \left (1 - (-1)^{\tfrac{n(n-1)}{2}} n u^2 \right ) \right) \\
&= (-1)^{\frac{n(n-1)}{2}} n^n (n-1)^{n-1} t^{n-1} \left ((-1)^{\tfrac{n(n-1)}{2}} n u^2 \right ) \\
&= n^{n+1} (n-1)^{n-1} t^{n-1} u^2
\end{align}$$

which is a perfect square when n is odd.

==== Even degree ====
Let:

$$t = \frac{1}{1 + (-1)^{\tfrac{n(n-1)}{2}} (n-1) u^2}$$

Under this substitution the discriminant of g(y, t) equals:

$$\begin{align}
(-1)^{\frac{n(n-1)}{2}} n^n (n-1)^{n-1} t^{n-1} (1-t)
&= (-1)^{\frac{n(n-1)}{2}} n^n (n-1)^{n-1} t^{n-1} \left (1 - \frac{1}{1 + (-1)^{\tfrac{n(n-1)}{2}} (n-1) u^2} \right ) \\
&= (-1)^{\frac{n(n-1)}{2}} n^n (n-1)^{n-1} t^{n-1} \left ( \frac{\left ( 1 + (-1)^{\tfrac{n(n-1)}{2}} (n-1) u^2 \right ) - 1}{1 + (-1)^{\tfrac{n(n-1)}{2}} (n-1) u^2} \right ) \\
&= (-1)^{\frac{n(n-1)}{2}} n^n (n-1)^{n-1} t^{n-1} \left ( \frac{(-1)^{\tfrac{n(n-1)}{2}} (n-1) u^2}{1 + (-1)^{\tfrac{n(n-1)}{2}} (n-1) u^2} \right ) \\
&= (-1)^{\frac{n(n-1)}{2}} n^n (n-1)^{n-1} t^{n-1} \left (t (-1)^{\tfrac{n(n-1)}{2}} (n-1) u^2 \right ) \\
&= n^n (n-1)^n t^n u^2
\end{align}$$

which is a perfect square when n is even.

Again, Hilbert's irreducibility theorem implies the existence of infinitely many specializations whose Galois groups are alternating groups.

== Rigid groups ==
Suppose that C_{1}, …, C_{n} are conjugacy classes of a finite group G, and A be the set of n-tuples (g_{1}, …, g_{n}) of G such that g_{i} is in C_{i} and the product g_{1}…g_{n} is trivial. Then A is called rigid if it is nonempty, G acts transitively on it by conjugation, and each element of A generates G.

Thompson (1984) showed that if a finite group G has a rigid set then it can often be realized as a Galois group over a cyclotomic extension of the rationals. (More precisely, over the cyclotomic extension of the rationals generated by the values of the irreducible characters of G on the conjugacy classes C_{i}.)

This can be used to show that many finite simple groups, including the monster group, are Galois groups of extensions of the rationals. The monster group is generated by a triad of elements of orders 2, 3, and 29. All such triads are conjugate.

The prototype for rigidity is the symmetric group S_{n}, which is generated by an n-cycle and a transposition whose product is an (n − 1)-cycle. The construction in the preceding section used these generators to establish a polynomial's Galois group.

== A construction with an elliptic modular function ==
Let n > 1 be any integer. A lattice Λ in the complex plane with period ratio τ has a sublattice Λ′ with period ratio nτ. The latter lattice is one of a finite set of sublattices permuted by the modular group PSL(2, Z), which is based on changes of basis for Λ. Let j denote the elliptic modular function of Felix Klein. Define the polynomial φ_{n} as the product of the differences (X − j(Λ_{i})) over the conjugate sublattices. As a polynomial in X, φ_{n} has coefficients that are polynomials over $\mathbb{Q}$ in j(τ).

On the conjugate lattices, the modular group acts as PGL(2, Z/nZ). It follows that φ_{n} has Galois group isomorphic to PGL(2, Z/nZ) over $\mathbb{Q}(\mathrm{J}(\tau))$.

Use of Hilbert's irreducibility theorem gives an infinite (and dense) set of rational numbers specializing φ_{n} to polynomials with Galois group PGL(2, Z/nZ) over $\mathbb{Q}$. The groups PGL(2, Z/nZ) include infinitely many non-solvable groups.

== See also ==
- Semiabelian group (Galois theory)
