= Vinayak Vatsal =

Canadian mathematician

Vinayak Vatsal is a Canadian mathematician working in number theory and arithmetic geometry.

== Education ==
Vatsal received his B.Sc. degree in 1992 from Stanford University and a Ph.D. (thesis title: Iwasawa Theory, modular forms and Artin representations) in 1997 from Princeton University under the supervision of Andrew Wiles who had just completed his proof of Fermat's Last Theorem. He then became a post-doctoral fellow at the University of Toronto.

== Career and research ==
Vatsal joined the faculty at the University of British Columbia in 1999 where he still works today.

Vatsal's contributions include his work on the Iwasawa theory of elliptic curves, a field which he approached using novel ideas from ergodic theory.

Vatsal has received numerous accolades. He was a Sloan Fellow in 2002–2004 and a recipient of the André Aisenstadt Prize (2004), the Ribenboim Prize (2006) and the Coxeter–James Prize (2007). In 2008, he was an invited speaker at the 2008 International Congress of Mathematicians in Madrid.

== Selected publications ==
- Uniform distribution of Heegner Points, Inventiones Mathematicae, Vol. 148, 2002, pp. 1–48 (Proof of a conjecture of Barry Mazur)
- with Ralph Greenberg Iwasawa Invariants of Elliptic Curves, Inventiones Mathematicae, vol 142, 2000, pp. 17–63
- Special values of anticyclotomic L-functions, Duke Mathematical Journal, vol. 116, 2003, pp. 219–261
- with C. Cornut Nontriviality of Rankin-Selberg L-functions and CM points, in Burns, Kevin Buzzard, Nekovar (eds), L-functions and Galois Representations, Cambridge University Press, 2007, pp. 121–186
- with C. Cornut CM points and quaternion algebras, Documenta Mathematica, volume 10, 2005

== Other ==
Vatsal is also a published author. His short story Mosaic appared in the Summer 1995 edition of Story magazine.
