= Taniyama's problems =

36 mathematical problems stated in 1955

Taniyama's problems are a set of 36 mathematical problems posed by Japanese mathematician Yutaka Taniyama in 1955. The problems primarily focused on algebraic geometry, number theory, and the connections between modular forms and elliptic curves. Taniyama's twelfth and thirteenth problems were the precursor to the Taniyama–Shimura conjecture, also known as the modularity theorem, which would be used in Andrew Wiles' proof of Fermat's Last Theorem in 1995.

== History ==
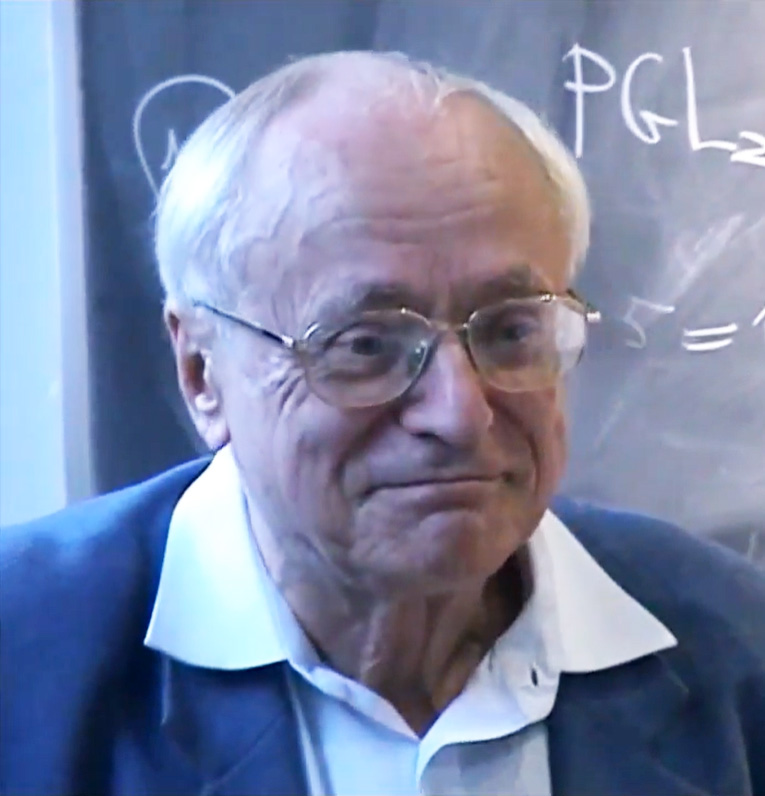
French mathematician Jean-Pierre Serre, a participant in the 1955 international symposium, brought attention to Taniyama's problems in the early 1970s.

In the 1950s post-World War II period of mathematics, there was renewed interest in the theory of modular curves due to the work of Taniyama and Goro Shimura. During the 1955 international symposium on algebraic number theory at Tokyo and Nikkō, (Note: the first symposium of its kind to be held in Japan that was attended by international mathematicians including Jean-Pierre Serre, Emil Artin, Andre Weil, Richard Brauer, K. G. Ramanathan, and Daniel Zelinsky) Taniyama compiled his 36 problems in a document titled "Problems of Number Theory" and distributed mimeographs of his collection to the symposium's participants. Serre later brought attention to these problems in the early 1970s.

The most well-known of Taniyama's problems are his twelfth and thirteenth problems. These problems led to the formulation of the Taniyama–Shimura conjecture (now known as the modularity theorem), which states that every elliptic curve over the rational numbers is modular. This conjecture played a major role in Andrew Wiles' proof of Fermat's Last Theorem in 1995.

Taniyama's problems influenced the development of the Langlands program, the theory of modular forms, and the study of elliptic curves.

== The problems ==
Taniyama's tenth problem addressed Dedekind zeta functions and Hecke L-series, and while distributed in English at the 1955 Tokyo-Nikkō conference attended by both Serre and André Weil, it was only formally published in Japanese in Taniyama's collected works.

Taniyama's tenth problem (translated)

Let $k$ be a totally real number field, and $F(\tau)$ be a Hilbert modular form to the field $k$. Then, choosing $F(\tau)$ in a suitable manner, we can obtain a system of Erich Hecke's L-series with Größencharakter $\lambda$, which corresponds one-to-one to this $F(\tau)$ by the process of Mellin transformation. This can be proved by a generalization of the theory of operator $T$ of Hecke to Hilbert modular functions (cf. Hermann Weyl).

According to Serge Lang, Taniyama's eleventh problem deals with elliptic curves with complex multiplication, but is unrelated to Taniyama's twelfth and thirteenth problems.

Taniyama's twelfth problem (translated)

Let $C$ be an elliptic curve defined over an algebraic number field $k$, and $L_C(s)$ the L-function of $C$ over $k$ in the sense that $\zeta_C(s) = \zeta_k(s) \zeta_k(s-1) /L_C(s)$ is the zeta function of $C$ over $k$. If the Hasse–Weil conjecture is true for $\zeta_C(s)$, then the Fourier series obtained from $L_C(s)$ by the inverse Mellin transformation must be an automorphic form of dimension −2 of a special type (see Hecke (Note: The reference to Hecke in Problem 12 was to his paper, "fiber die Bestimmung Dirichletscher Reihen durch ihre Funktionalgleichung", which involves not only congruence subgroups of $\text{SL}_2(\mathbb Z)$ but also some Fuchsian groups not commensurable with it.)). If so, it is very plausible that this form is an elliptic differential of the field of associated automorphic functions. Now, going through these observations backward, is it possible to prove the Hasse–Weil conjecture by finding a suitable automorphic form from which $L_C(s)$ can be obtained?

Taniyama's twelfth problem's suggests a deep connection between elliptic curves and modular forms. Taniyama's original formulation was somewhat imprecise; it would later be refined into the modularity theorem. Fellow Japanese mathematician Goro Shimura noted that Taniyama's formulation in his twelfth problem was unclear: the proposed Mellin transform method would only work for elliptic curves over rational numbers. According to mathematician Barry Mazur, the status of the problem remains unclear for curves over number fields.

Taniyama's thirteenth problem (translated)

To characterize the field of elliptic modular functions of level $N$, and especially to decompose the Jacobian variety $J$ of this function field into simple factors up to isogeny. Also it is well known that if $N = q$, a prime, and $q \equiv 3 \pmod 4$, then $J$ contains elliptic curves with complex multiplication. What can one say for general $N$?

== See also ==
- Hilbert's problems
- Thurston's 24 questions
- List of unsolved problems in mathematics
- Wiles's proof of Fermat's Last Theorem
