= Deformation ring =

Mathematical tool associated with lifting problems

In mathematics, a deformation ring is a ring that controls liftings of a representation of a profinite group (usually a Galois group) from a finite field to a local ring. In particular, for any such lifting problem there is often a universal deformation ring that classifies all such liftings, and whose spectrum is the universal deformation space.

A key step in Wiles's proof of the modularity theorem was to study the relation between universal deformation rings and Hecke algebras.

== Coefficient rings and the deformation functor ==
For a (fixed) finite field $k$, a coefficient ring for $k$ is a commutative Noetherian local ring $(R, \mathfrak{m})$ which is complete in the $\mathfrak{m}$-adic topology, whose residue field is identified with $k$. Write $\pi_R : R \twoheadrightarrow k$ for the quotient map. A morphism of coefficient rings $\varphi : R \to R'$ is a continuous homomorphism of local rings such that $\pi_R = \pi_{R'} \circ \varphi$. The category of coefficient rings will be denoted $\mathcal{C}$.

For example, if $k = \mathbb{F}_p$ is the finite field with $p$ elements, then the ring of $p$-adic integers $\mathbb{Z}_p$ as well as its associated formal power series ring $\mathbb{Z}_p[\![X]\!]$ are both coefficient rings for $k$, and the inclusion map $\mathbb{Z}_p \to \mathbb{Z}_p[\![X]\!]$ is a morphism of coefficient rings.

The $\pi_R$ maps induce maps $(\pi_{R})_* : \mathrm{GL}_n(R) \to \mathrm{GL}_n(k)$, whose kernel is denoted $\Gamma_n(R)$. Thus, any group representation $\rho : G \to \mathrm{GL}_n(R)$ gives us a related $k$-valued representation $\overline{\rho} : G \to \mathrm{GL}_n(k)$ via $\overline{\rho} := \pi_R \circ \rho$. Such $\overline\rho$ is called the residual representation of $\rho$.

Two continuous representations $\rho_1,\rho_2 : \Pi \to \mathrm{GL}_n(R)$ of a profinite group $\Pi$ are said to be strictly equivalent if there exists $M \in \Gamma_n(R)$ such that $M^{-1}\rho_1 M = \rho_2.$ This is stronger than the usual isomorphism of representations, since we require that the isomorphism $\rho_1 \stackrel{\sim}{\rightarrow} \rho_2$ induces the identity map on residual representations.

A deformation of $\overline{\rho} : \Pi \to \mathrm{GL}_n(k)$ to a coefficient ring $R$ is a strict equivalence class of continuous lifts of $\overline\rho$ through the reduction map $(\pi_R)_* : \mathrm{GL}_n(R) \to \mathrm{GL}_n(k)$. Informally, any continuous lift $\rho : \Pi \to \mathrm{GL}_n(R)$ may be referred to as a deformation of $\overline\rho$, but in this sense two deformations are considered the same if and only if the underlying representations are strictly equivalent. Let $\mathrm{Def}_{\overline\rho}(R)$ denote the set of deformations of $\overline\rho$ to $R$.

Any morphism of coefficient rings $\varphi : R \to R'$ must send $\Gamma_n(R)$ to $\varphi_*[\Gamma_n(R)] \subseteq \Gamma_n(R')$, so if we fix a residual deformation $\overline\rho$, we see that composition with $\varphi_*$sends $R$-valued deformations of $\overline{\rho}$ to $R'$-valued deformations of $\overline\rho$. In other words, $\mathrm{Def}_{\overline\rho}$ defines a (covariant) functor $\mathrm{Def}_{\overline\rho} : \mathcal{C} \to \mathbf{Set}$.

== Deformation rings ==
If we fix a residual representation $\overline\rho : \Pi \to \mathrm{GL}_n(k)$, then under certain conditions (most notably that the representation $\overline\rho$ admits only scalar automorphisms) one can show that the deformation functor $\mathrm{Def}_{\overline\rho}$ is representable, in that there exists some coefficient ring $R_{\overline\rho}$ such that $\mathrm{Def}_{\rho}(R') \cong \mathrm{Hom}_{\mathcal{C}}(R_{\overline\rho}, R')$. Such a coefficient ring $R_{\overline\rho}$ is called a (universal) deformation ring for $\overline\rho$. Consequently, any deformation $\rho : \Pi \to \mathrm{GL}_n(R_{\overline\rho})$ of $\overline\rho$ must be of the form $\rho = \varphi_* \circ \rho_{\mathrm{univ}}$ for some deformation $\rho_{\mathrm{univ}} : \Pi \to \mathrm{GL}_n(R_{\overline\rho})$ and some $\varphi \in \mathrm{End}_{\mathcal{C}}(R_{\overline\rho})$. The pair $(R_{\overline\rho}, \rho_{\mathrm{univ}})$ is called a universal deformation of $\overline\rho$.

More concisely, such a pair $(R_{\overline\rho}, \rho_{\mathrm{univ}})$ is uniquely characterised by the following universal property: if $R$ is any coefficient ring and $\rho : \Pi \to \mathrm{GL}_n(R)$ is any deformation of $\overline\rho$ to $R$, then there is a unique $\mathcal{C}$-morphism $\varphi : R_{\overline\rho} \to R$ such that $\rho = \varphi_* \circ \rho_{\mathrm{univ}}$. As a consequence of this universal property, deformation rings are unique up to unique isomorphism.

== Example in dimension 1 ==
For $p$ an odd prime number and $\Pi = G_{\Q, S}$ the absolute Galois group of the rational numbers with ramification restricted to $S = T \cup \{p\}$, where $T$ is the set of primes dividing $p-1$. Let $\varepsilon : \Pi \to \mathbb{F}_p^\times$ denote the $p$-adic cyclotomic character given by
$$\Pi \twoheadrightarrow \mathrm{Gal}(\Q(\zeta_p)/\Q) \,\stackrel{\sim}{\to}\, \mathbb{F}_p^\times,$$
with $\zeta_p = e^{2 \pi i /p}$ a primitive $p$th root of unity. One can show in this case that deformation ring is exactly the completed group ring $\Z_p[\![\Gamma^{\mathrm{ab}}]\!]$, where $\Gamma$ is the maximal pro-$p$-quotient of $\Pi$, and a universal deformation for $\varepsilon$ is given by
$$\chi_{\mathrm{univ}} : G_{\Q} \to \Z_p[\![\Gamma^{\mathrm{ab}}]\!]^\times;\qquad \sigma \mapsto \hat{\varepsilon}(\sigma)\varpi(\sigma),$$
where $\hat{\varepsilon} : \Pi \to \Z_p^\times$ is the composition of $\varepsilon$ with the Teichmüller character, and $\varpi : \Pi \twoheadrightarrow \Gamma^{\mathrm{ab}}$ is the quotient map.

== See also ==
- Deformation (mathematics)
- Galois module
- Galois representation
