= Ritabrata =

Ritabrata is a masculine given name. Notable people with the name include:

- Ritabrata Banerjee (born 1978), Indian politician
- Ritabrata Munshi (born 1976), Indian mathematician
