= Modularity theorem =

Relates rational elliptic curves to modular forms

- Field: Number theory
- Conjectured by: Yutaka Taniyama; Goro Shimura
- Conjectured in: 1957
- First proof by: Christophe Breuil; Brian Conrad; Fred Diamond; Richard Taylor
- First proof in: 2001
- Consequences: Fermat's Last Theorem

In number theory, the modularity theorem states that elliptic curves over the field of rational numbers are related to modular forms in a particular way. Before its proof in 2001, the statement was known as the Taniyama–Shimura conjecture, Taniyama–Shimura–Weil conjecture, or the modularity conjecture for elliptic curves.

Andrew Wiles and Richard Taylor proved the modularity theorem for semistable elliptic curves in 1995, which was enough to imply Fermat's Last Theorem (FLT). Later, a series of papers by Wiles's former students Brian Conrad, Fred Diamond and Richard Taylor, culminating in a joint paper with Christophe Breuil, extended Wiles's techniques to prove the full modularity theorem.

== Statement ==
The theorem states that any elliptic curve over $\Q$ can be obtained via a rational map with integer coefficients from the classical modular curve X_{0}(N) for some integer N; this is a curve with integer coefficients with an explicit definition. This mapping is called a modular parametrization of level N. If N is the smallest integer for which such a parametrization can be found (which by the modularity theorem itself is now known to be a number called the conductor), then the parametrization may be defined in terms of a mapping generated by a particular kind of modular form of weight two and level N, a normalized newform with integer q-expansion, followed if need be by an isogeny.

=== Related statements ===
The modularity theorem implies a closely related analytic statement:

To each elliptic curve E over $\Q$ we may attach a corresponding L-series. The L-series is a Dirichlet series, commonly written

$$L(E, s) = \sum_{n=1}^\infty \frac{a_n}{n^s}.$$

The generating function of the coefficients a_{n} is then

$$f(E, q) = \sum_{n=1}^\infty a_n q^n.$$

If we make the substitution

$$q = e^{2 \pi i \tau}$$

we see that we have written the Fourier expansion of a function f(E,τ) of the complex variable τ, so the coefficients of the q-series are also thought of as the Fourier coefficients of f. The function obtained in this way is, remarkably, a cusp form of weight two and level N and is also an eigenform (an eigenvector of all Hecke operators); this is the Hasse–Weil conjecture, which follows from the modularity theorem.

Some modular forms of weight two, in turn, correspond to holomorphic differentials for an elliptic curve. The Jacobian of the modular curve can (up to isogeny) be written as a product of irreducible Abelian varieties, corresponding to Hecke eigenforms of weight 2. The 1-dimensional factors are elliptic curves (there can also be higher-dimensional factors, so not all Hecke eigenforms correspond to rational elliptic curves). The curve obtained by finding the corresponding cusp form, and then constructing a curve from it, is isogenous to the original curve (but not, in general, isomorphic to it).

== History ==
Yutaka Taniyama stated a preliminary (slightly incorrect) version of the conjecture at the 1955 international symposium on algebraic number theory in Tokyo and Nikkō as the twelfth of his set of 36 unsolved problems. Goro Shimura and Taniyama worked on improving its rigor until 1957. André Weil rediscovered the conjecture, and showed in 1967 that it would follow from the (conjectured) functional equations for some twisted L-series of the elliptic curve; this was the first serious evidence that the conjecture might be true. Weil also showed that the conductor of the elliptic curve should be the level of the corresponding modular form. The Taniyama–Shimura–Weil conjecture became a part of the Langlands program.

The conjecture attracted considerable interest when Gerhard Frey suggested in 1986 that it implies FLT. He did this by attempting to show that any counterexample to FLT would imply the existence of at least one non-modular elliptic curve. This argument was moved closer to its goal in 1987 when Jean-Pierre Serre identified a missing link (now known as the epsilon conjecture or Ribet's theorem) in Frey's original work, followed two years later by Ken Ribet's completion of a proof of the epsilon conjecture.

Even after gaining serious attention, the Taniyama–Shimura–Weil conjecture was seen by contemporary mathematicians as extraordinarily difficult to prove or perhaps even inaccessible to proof. For example, Wiles's Ph.D. supervisor John Coates states that it seemed "impossible to actually prove", and Ken Ribet considered himself "one of the vast majority of people who believed [it] was completely inaccessible".

With Ribet’s proof of the epsilon conjecture, Andrew Wiles saw an opportunity: Fermat’s Last Theorem was a respectable research project because it was now a corollary of the TSW conjecture. He had expertise in Iwasawa theory; maybe there was a path from Iwasawa theory to Taniyama–Shimura–Weil.

In 1995, Andrew Wiles, with some help from Richard Taylor, proved the Taniyama–Shimura–Weil conjecture for all semistable elliptic curves. Wiles used this to prove FLT, and the full Taniyama–Shimura–Weil conjecture was finally proved by Diamond, Conrad, Diamond & Taylor; and Breuil, Conrad, Diamond & Taylor; building on Wiles's work, they incrementally chipped away at the remaining cases until the full result was proved in 2001. Once fully proven, the conjecture became known as the modularity theorem.

Several theorems in number theory similar to FLT follow from the modularity theorem. For example: no cube can be written as a sum of two coprime nth powers, n ≥ 3. (Note: The case n = 3 was already known by Euler.)

== Generalizations ==
The modularity theorem is a special case of more general conjectures due to Robert Langlands. The Langlands program seeks to attach an automorphic form or automorphic representation (a suitable generalization of a modular form) to more general objects of arithmetic algebraic geometry, such as to every elliptic curve over a number field. Most cases of these extended conjectures have not yet been proved.

In 2013, Freitas, Le Hung, and Siksek proved that elliptic curves defined over real quadratic fields are modular. In 2025, modularity was extended to over 10% of abelian surfaces by Boxer, Calegari, Gee and Pilloni. In 2023, Caraiani and Newton proved that elliptic curves over almost all imaginary quadratic fields, and for many CM fields, are modular. In 2026, OpenAI claimed to have completed the Caraiani-Newton strategy to cover all imaginary quadratic fields.

== Example ==
For example, the elliptic curve y^{2} + y = x^{3} − x, with discriminant (and conductor) 37, is associated to the form

$$f(z) = q - 2q^2 - 3q^3 + 2q^4 - 2q^5 + 6q^6 + \cdots, \qquad q = e^{2 \pi i z}$$

For prime numbers l not equal to 37, one can verify the property about the coefficients. Thus, for l = 3, there are 6 solutions of the equation modulo 3: (0, 0), (0, 1), (1, 0), (1, 1), (2, 0), (2, 1); thus a(3) = 3 − 6 = −3.

The conjecture, going back to the 1950s, was completely proven by 1999 using the ideas of Andrew Wiles, who proved it in 1994 for a large family of elliptic curves.

There are several formulations of the conjecture. Showing that they are equivalent was a main challenge of number theory in the second half of the 20th century. The modularity of an elliptic curve E of conductor N can be expressed also by saying that there is a non-constant rational map defined over ℚ, from the modular curve X_{0}(N) to E. In particular, the points of E can be parametrized by modular functions.

For example, a modular parametrization of the curve y^{2} − y = x^{3} − x is given by

$$\begin{align}
x(z) &= q^{-2} + 2q^{-1} + 5 + 9q + 18q^2 + 29q^3 + 51q^4 +\cdots\\
y(z) &= q^{-3} + 3q^{-2} + 9q^{-1} + 21 + 46q + 92q^2 + 180q^3 +\cdots
\end{align}$$

where, as above, q = e^{2πiz}. The functions x(z) and y(z) are modular of weight 0 and level 37; in other words they are meromorphic, defined on the upper half-plane Im(z) > 0 and satisfy

$$x\!\left(\frac{az + b}{cz + d}\right) = x(z)$$

and likewise for y(z), for all integers a, b, c, d with ad − bc = 1 and 37 | c.

Another formulation depends on the comparison of Galois representations attached on the one hand to elliptic curves, and on the other hand to modular forms. The latter formulation has been used in the proof of the conjecture. Dealing with the level of the forms (and the connection to the conductor of the curve) is particularly delicate.

The most spectacular application of the conjecture is the proof of Fermat's Last Theorem (FLT). Suppose that for a prime p ≥ 5, the Fermat equation

$$a^p + b^p = c^p$$

has a solution with non-zero integers, hence a counter-example to FLT. Then as Yves Hellegouarch was the first to notice, the elliptic curve

$$y^2 = x(x - a^p)(x + b^p)$$

of discriminant

$$\Delta = \frac{1}{256}(abc)^{2p}$$

cannot be modular. Thus, the proof of the Taniyama–Shimura–Weil conjecture for this family of elliptic curves (called Hellegouarch–Frey curves) implies FLT. The proof of the link between these two statements, based on an idea of Gerhard Frey (1985), is difficult and technical. It was established by Kenneth Ribet in 1987.
