= Sarah Zerbes =

German algebraic number theorist

Sarah Livia Zerbes (German pronunciation: [tsɛrbəs], born 2 August 1978) is a German algebraic number theorist at ETH Zurich. Her research interests include L-functions, modular forms, p-adic Hodge theory, and Iwasawa theory, and her work has led to new insights towards the Birch and Swinnerton-Dyer conjecture, which predicts the number of rational points on an elliptic curve by the behavior of an associated L-function.

== Education and career ==
Zerbes read mathematics at the University of Cambridge, earning first class honours in 2001. She completed a Ph.D. at Cambridge in 2005; her dissertation, Selmer groups over non-commutative p-adic Lie extensions, was supervised by John H. Coates.

While still a graduate student, she became a Marie Curie Fellow at the Institut Henri Poincaré in Paris, and after completing her doctorate she undertook postdoctoral studies as a Hodge Fellow at the Institut des Hautes Études Scientifiques near Paris, as a Chapman Fellow at Imperial College London, and (while working as a lecturer at the University of Exeter beginning in 2008) as a postdoctoral fellow under the support of the Engineering and Physical Sciences Research Council.

She took another lectureship at University College London in 2012, and was a professor there from 2016 until 2021. Zerbes also serves on the council of the London Mathematical Society. Since 1 January 2022 she is a full professor of Mathematics at ETH Zürich.

== Recognition ==
Zerbes won a Philip Leverhulme Prize in 2014, jointly with her husband and frequent research collaborator David Loeffler of the University of Warwick. In 2015 Zerbes and Loeffler won the Whitehead Prize "for their work in number theory, in particular for their discovery of a new Euler system, and for their applications of this to generalisations of the Birch–Swinnerton-Dyer conjecture."

She was elected to the Academia Europaea in 2025.
