= Paul Wolfskehl =

German mathematician (1856–1906)

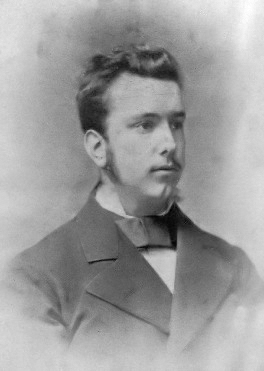
Paul Wolfskehl (c. 1880)

Paul Friedrich Wolfskehl (30 June 1856 in Darmstadt – 13 September 1906 in Darmstadt), was a physician with an interest in mathematics. He bequeathed 100,000 marks (equivalent to €720,000 in 2023) to the first person to prove Fermat's Last Theorem.

He was the younger of two sons of a banker, Joseph Carl Theodor Wolfskehl. His elder brother, the jurist Wilhelm Otto Wolfskehl, took over the family bank after the death of his father. From 1875 to 1880 Paul Wolfskehl studied medicine at the Universities of Leipzig, Tübingen and Heidelberg. In 1880 he received his doctorate from the Heidelberg University. At about this time, he began to suffer from multiple sclerosis, which eventually forced him to pursue another career. From 1880 to 1883 he studied mathematics at the universities of Bonn and Bern. In 1887 he habilitated at the Technische Hochschule Darmstadt and became a Privatdozent for mathematics at the university.

There are a number of theories concerning the prize's origin. Mathematician Alexander Ostrowski had heard from an unidentified source that Wolfskehl was rejected and decided to commit suicide, but was distracted by a paper by Ernst Kummer and abandoned the attempt. The paper had detected a flaw in Augustin Cauchy's attempted proof of Fermat's Last Theorem, and afterwards he established a prize to solve the theorem. Philip Davis and William Chinn published Ostrowski's version of the story in their 1969 book 3.1416 and All That. Another theory claimed that Wolfskehl wrote his wife out of his will at the end of his life after an unhappy marriage. On June 27, 1997, the prize was finally won by Andrew Wiles.

The play From Abstraction by Robert Thorogood is based on the life of Wolfskehl. It was broadcast on BBC Radio 4 on 1 November 2006 and 29 August 2008.

== See also ==
- Andrew Beal, a Dallas banker who has offered $1,000,000 for a proof or disproof of Beal's conjecture
- Wiles' proof of Fermat's Last Theorem
- Millennium Prize Problems
