= Matthias Flach (mathematician) =

German mathematician

- Born: 1963 (age 62–63)
- Education: University of Cambridge; Goethe University Frankfurt
- Known for: Algebraic geometry
- Children: Lucas Flach and Nicholas Flach
- Scientific career
- Fields: Mathematics
- Workplaces: California Institute of Technology
- Thesis: Selmer groups for the symmetric square of an elliptic curve (1991)
- Doctoral advisor: John Coates

Matthias Flach is a German mathematician, professor and former executive officer for mathematics (department chair) at California Institute of Technology.

== Professional overview ==
Research interests includes:

- Arithmetic algebraic geometry (see Glossary of arithmetic and Diophantine geometry).
- Special values of L-functions.
- Conjectures of:
  - Bloch
  - Beilinson
  - Deligne
  - Bloch–Kato conjecture (see also List of conjectures).
- Galois module theory.
- Motivic cohomology.

== Education overview ==
- Ph.D. University of Cambridge UK 1991 Dissertation: Selmer groups for the Symmetric Square of an Elliptic Curve – Algebraic geometry
- Diplom, Goethe University Frankfurt, Germany, 1986

== Publications ==
- Iwasawa Theory and Motivic L-functions (2009) – Flach, Matthias
- On Galois structure invariants associated to Tate motives – Matthias Flach and D. Burns, King's College London
- On the Equivariant Tamagawa Number Conjecture for Tate Motives, Part II. (2006) – Burns, David; Flach, Matthias.
- Euler characteristics in relative K-groups – Matthias Flach
- The equivariant Tamagawa number conjecture: A survey (with an appendix by C. Greither) – Matthias Flach
- A geometric example of non-abelian Iwasawa theory, June 2004, Canadian Number Theory Association VIII Meeting – Flach, Matthias.
- The Tamagawa number conjecture of adjoint motives of modular forms (2004) – Diamond, Fred; Flach, Matthias; Guo, Li.
- Adjoint motives of modular forms and the Tamagawa number conjecture (2001) – Fred Diamond; Matthias Flach; Li Guo.
