= Anupam Saikia =

Indian mathematician

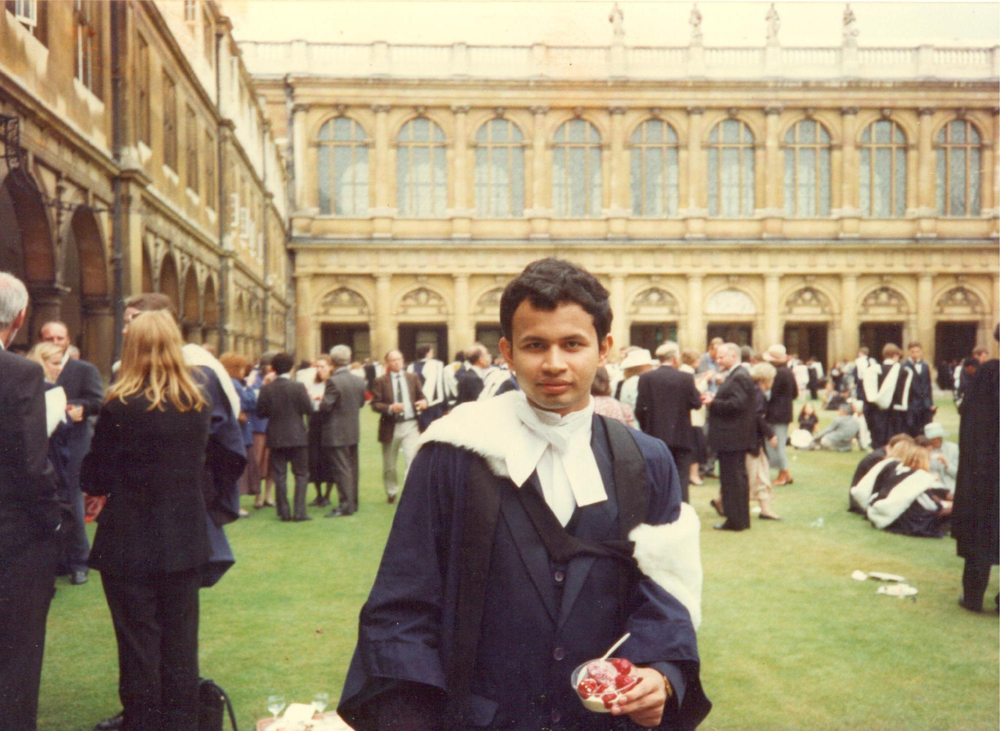
- Born: Assam, India
- Education: St. Stephen's College, Delhi Delhi University; Trinity College, Cambridge University of Cambridge
- Notable work: Arithmetic Number Theory

Anupam Saikia is an Indian mathematician and at present professor in the Department of Mathematics at IIT Guwahati, India. He is involved in work related to arithmetic number theory, in particular applications to Iwasawa Theory and p-adic measures.

== Biography ==
Saikia qualified his school leaving examinations from Govt. Higher Secondary School, Golaghat, Assam, in 1989. Then, he did his pre-university studies at Cotton College, Guwahati until 1991 and joined St. Stephen's College, Delhi for his Bachelors in Mathematics. After his B.Sc. degree in 1994, he joined Trinity College, Cambridge and became a wrangler in 1996. He completed his Certificate for Advanced Study in Mathematics (Mathematical Tripos, Part III) at Trinity College in 1997 with distinction, and then pursued his PhD degree from the Department of Pure Mathematics and Mathematical Statistics, University of Cambridge, which he received in 2001 for a thesis titled Iwasawa Theory of Lubin-Tate Division Towers and p-Adic L-Functions under the supervision of John Coates.

Since his PhD, Saikia has held post doctoral positions at several institutes, including IHES, France and McGill University, Canada. Following a brief period of time at IIT, Bombay, Saikia has been a member of the faculty at IIT, Guwahati since 2005, becoming full professor in 2015. At various times, he has held several administrative positions in IIT, Guwahati as well.

Saikia is also a keen sportsperson and was captain of the Trinity College Badminton team in 1999-99, as well as member of its cricket team. He is also an enthusiastic chess and carom player. He lives in Guwahati with his wife and children.

== Awards and honors ==
Saikia has won several awards and scholarships during his career. He won the Ramanujan Scholarship to pursue his studies at Cambridge, given to one Indian student each year. He was awarded the Smith and Knight Prize in the annual mathematics essay competition for second year Ph.D. students at the University of Cambridge in 1999 and the Senior Rouseball Scholarship, awarded by Trinity College, Cambridge on the basis of postgraduate research work in 2000-2001.

== Professional Contributions ==
He is the editor-in-chief of Journal of the Assam Academy of Mathematics and an associate editor of the Journal of the Ramanujan Mathematical Society and the Bulletin of the Mathematics Teachers' Association (India).
