= Matthias Flach =

Matthias Flach may refer to:

- Matthias Flach (mathematician)
- Matthias Flach (rower)
