= 9999 Wiles =

Koronian asteroid

- Orbit of Wiles (blue), the inner planets and Jupiter (outermost)

Discovery
- Discovered by: C. J. van Houten; I. van Houten-G. T. Gehrels
- Discovery date: 29 September 1973

Designations
- Named after: Andrew Wiles (British mathematician)
- Alternative designations: 4196 T-2 · 1995 EM_{8}
- Minor planet category: main-belt · Koronis

Orbital characteristics
- Epoch 4 September 2017 (JD 2458000.5)
- Uncertainty parameter 0
- Observation arc: 43.36 yr (15,837 days)
- Aphelion: 3.0391 AU
- Perihelion: 2.6386 AU
- Semi-major axis: 2.8388 AU
- Eccentricity: 0.0705
- Orbital period (sidereal): 4.78 yr (1,747 days)
- Mean anomaly: 114.03°
- Mean motion: 0° 12^{m} 21.96^{s} / day
- Inclination: 3.1995°
- Longitude of ascending node: 76.364°
- Argument of perihelion: 234.93°

Physical characteristics
- Dimensions: 5.78 km (calculated); 7.148±0.065 km
- Synodic rotation period: 3.47±0.020 h 3.482±0.0005 h
- Geometric albedo: 0.24 (assumed); 0.262±0.023
- Spectral type: LS · S · C
- Absolute magnitude (H): 12.8 · 12.906±0.002 (R) · 12.890±0.080 (R) · 13.0 · 13.04±0.44 · 13.36

9999 Wiles, provisional designation 4196 T-2, is a Koronian asteroid from the outer region of the asteroid belt, approximately 6 to 7 kilometers in diameter. It was named after British mathematician Andrew Wiles.

== Discovery ==
Wiles was discovered on 29 September 1973, by Dutch astronomer couple Ingrid and Cornelis van Houten at Leiden and Tom Gehrels at Palomar Observatory, California, United States. The body's observation arc begins at Palomar, 10 days prior to its official discovery observation.

The survey designation "T-2" stands for the second Palomar–Leiden Trojan survey, named after the fruitful collaboration of the Palomar and Leiden Observatory in the 1960s and 1970s. Gehrels used Palomar's Samuel Oschin telescope (also known as the 48-inch Schmidt Telescope), and shipped the photographic plates to Ingrid and Cornelis van Houten at Leiden Observatory where astrometry was carried out. The trio are credited with the discovery of several thousand minor planets.

== Classification and orbit ==
The asteroid is a member of the Koronis family, a collisional group consisting of a few hundred known bodies with nearly ecliptical orbits. It orbits the Sun in the outer main-belt at a distance of 2.6–3.0 AU once every 4 years and 9 months (1,747 days). Its orbit has an eccentricity of 0.07 and an inclination of 3° with respect to the ecliptic.

== Physical characteristics ==
Wiles' spectral type has been characterized as a LS-type, an intermediary between the common stony and rather rare L-type asteroid. Alternatively, and contrary to the body's determined albedo (see below), it is also considered to be a carbonaceous C-type asteroid.

=== Rotation period ===
In early 2014, two rotational lightcurves of Wiles were obtained from photometric observations in the R-band at the Palomar Transient Factory in California. Lightcurve analysis gave a rotation period of 3.47 and 3.482 hours with a brightness variation of 0.13 and 0.15 magnitude (U=2/2).

=== Diameter and albedo ===
According to the survey carried out by NASA's Wide-field Infrared Survey Explorer with its subsequent NEOWISE mission, Wiles measures 7.148 kilometers in diameter and its surface has an albedo of 0.262, while the Collaborative Asteroid Lightcurve Link assumes a standard albedo for members of the Koronis family of 0.24, and calculates a diameter of 17.12 kilometers with an absolute magnitude of 11.0.

== Naming ==
This minor planet was named after of Andrew J. Wiles (born 1953), a British mathematician and professor at Princeton University, who is best known for proving Fermat's Last Theorem in 1993. The naming was proposed by Lutz D. Schmadel, who also prepared the citation. It was published on 2 April 1999 (M.P.C. 34356).
