= Brian Conrad =

American mathematician

- Born: November 20, 1970 (age 56); New York City, NY, US
- Education: Princeton University (doctorate); Harvard College (undergraduate)
- Awards: Presidential Early Career Award for Scientists and Engineers
- Scientific career
- Fields: Mathematics
- Workplaces: Stanford University; Columbia University; University of Michigan
- Thesis: Finite Honda systems and supersingular elliptic curves (1996)
- Doctoral advisor: Andrew Wiles

Brian Conrad (born November 20, 1970) is an American mathematician and number theorist, working at Stanford University. Previously, he taught at the University of Michigan and at Columbia University.

Conrad and others proved the modularity theorem, also known as the Taniyama-Shimura Conjecture. He proved this in 1999 with Christophe Breuil, Fred Diamond and Richard Taylor, while holding a joint postdoctoral position at Harvard University and the Institute for Advanced Study in Princeton, New Jersey.

Conrad received his bachelor's degree from Harvard in 1992, where he won a prize for his undergraduate thesis. He did his doctoral work under Andrew Wiles and went on to receive his Ph.D. from Princeton University in 1996 with a dissertation titled Finite Honda Systems And Supersingular Elliptic Curves. He was also featured as an extra in Nova's The Proof.

His identical twin brother Keith Conrad, also a number theorist, is a professor at the University of Connecticut.

He was awarded the Barry Prize for Distinguished Intellectual Achievement by the American Academy of Sciences and Letters in 2024.
