= Christophe Breuil =

French mathematician (born 1968)

- Born: 1968 (age 57–58)
- Education: École Polytechnique
- Scientific career
- Fields: Mathematician
- Workplaces: IHES
- Thesis: Cohomologie log-cristalline et representations galoisiennes p-adiques (1996)
- Doctoral advisor: Jean-Marc Fontaine

Christophe Breuil (French: [kʁistɔf bʁœj]; born 1968) is a French mathematician, who works in arithmetic geometry and algebraic number theory.

== Work ==
With Fred Diamond, Richard Taylor and Brian Conrad in 1999, he proved the Taniyama–Shimura conjecture, which previously had only been proved for semistable elliptic curves by Andrew Wiles and Taylor in their proof of Fermat's Last Theorem. Later, he worked on the p-adic Langlands conjecture.

== Academic life ==
Breuil attended schools in Brive-la-Gaillarde and Toulouse and studied from 1990 to 1992 at the École Polytechnique. In 1993, he obtained his DEA degree at the Paris-Sud 11 University located in Orsay. From 1993 to 1996 he conducted research at the École Polytechnique and taught simultaneously at the University of Paris-Sud, Orsay, and in 1996 received his PhD from the École Polytechnique, supervised by Jean-Marc Fontaine with the thesis "Cohomologie log-cristalline et représentations galoisiennes p -adiques". In 1997, he gave the Cours Peccot at the Collège de France. In 2001 he obtained a habilitation degree entitled "Aspects entiers de la théorie de Hodge p-adique et applications" at Paris-Sud 11 University. Between 2002 and 2010 he was at the IHES. From 2010 he has been in the Mathematics Department of University of Paris-Sud as Director of Research with the CNRS. In 2007–2008 he was a visiting professor at Columbia University.

== Awards and recognition ==
In 1993 he was awarded the Prix Gaston Julia at the École Polytechnique.

In 2002 he received the Grand Prix Jacques Herbrand of the French Academy of Sciences and the 2006 Prix Dargelos Anciens Élèves of the École Polytechnique.

He was an invited speaker in International Congress of Mathematicians 2010, Hyderabad on the topic of "Number Theory."
