= Euler system =

Mathematical concept

In mathematics, particularly number theory, an Euler system is a collection of compatible elements of Galois cohomology groups indexed by fields. They were introduced by Kolyvagin (1990) in his work on Heegner points on modular elliptic curves, which was motivated by his earlier paper Kolyvagin (1988) and the work of Thaine (1988). Euler systems are named after Leonhard Euler because the factors relating different elements of an Euler system resemble the Euler factors of an Euler product.

Euler systems can be used to construct annihilators of ideal class groups or Selmer groups, thus giving bounds on their orders, which in turn has led to deep theorems such as the finiteness of some Tate-Shafarevich groups. This led to Karl Rubin's new proof of the main conjecture of Iwasawa theory, considered simpler than the original proof due to Barry Mazur and Andrew Wiles.

== Definition ==
Although there are several definitions of special sorts of Euler system, there seems to be no published definition of an Euler system that covers all known cases. But it is possible to say roughly what an Euler system is, as follows:

- An Euler system is given by collection of elements c_{F}. These elements are often indexed by certain number fields F containing some fixed number field K, or by something closely related such as square-free integers. The elements c_{F} are typically elements of some Galois cohomology group such as H^{1}(F, T) where T is a p-adic representation of the absolute Galois group of K.
- The most important condition is that the elements c_{F} and c_{G} for two different fields F ⊆ G are related by a simple formula, such as

$${\rm cor}_{G/F}(c_G) = \prod_{q\in \Sigma(G/F)}P(\mathrm{Fr}_q^{-1}|{\rm Hom}_O(T,O(1));\mathrm{Fr}_q^{-1})c_F$$
Here the "Euler factor" P(τ|B;x) is defined to be the element det(1-τx|B) considered as an element of O[x], which when x happens to act on B is not the same as det(1-τx|B) considered as an element of O.

- There may be other conditions that the c_{F} have to satisfy, such as congruence conditions.

Kazuya Kato refers to the elements in an Euler system as "arithmetic incarnations of zeta" and describes the property of being an Euler system as "an arithmetic reflection of the fact that these incarnations are related to special values of Euler products".

== Examples ==
=== Cyclotomic units ===
For every square-free positive integer n pick an n-th root ζ_{n} of 1, with ζ_{mn} = ζ_{m}ζ_{n} for m,n coprime. Then the cyclotomic Euler system is the set of numbers α_{n} = 1 − ζ_{n}. These satisfy the relations

$$N_{Q(\zeta_{nl})/Q(\zeta_l)}(\alpha_{nl}) = \alpha_n^{F_l-1}$$
$\alpha_{nl}\equiv\alpha_n$ modulo all primes above l

where l is a prime not dividing n and F_{l} is a Frobenius automorphism with F_{l}(ζ_{n}) = ζ^{l}_{n}. Kolyvagin used this Euler system to give an elementary proof of the Gras conjecture.

=== Heegner points ===
Kolyvagin constructed an Euler system from the Heegner points of an elliptic curve, and used this to show that in some cases the Tate-Shafarevich group is finite.

=== Kato's Euler system ===
Kato's Euler system consists of certain elements occurring in the algebraic K-theory of modular curves. These elements—named Beilinson elements after Alexander Beilinson who introduced them in Beilinson (1984)—were used by Kazuya Kato in Kato (2004) to prove one divisibility in Barry Mazur's main conjecture of Iwasawa theory for elliptic curves.
