= Selmer group =

Construct in mathematics

In arithmetic geometry, the Selmer group, named in honor of the work of Ernst Sejersted Selmer (1951) by John William Scott Cassels (1962), is a group constructed from an isogeny of abelian varieties.

== Selmer group of an isogeny ==
The Selmer group of an abelian variety $A$ with respect to an isogeny $f:A\to B$ of abelian varieties can be defined in terms of Galois cohomology as

$$\operatorname{Sel}^{(f)}(A/K)=\bigcap_v\ker(H^1(G_K,\ker(f)) \rightarrow H^1(G_{K_v},A_v[f])/\operatorname{im}(\kappa_v))$$

where $A_v[f]$ denotes the $f$-torsion of $A_v$ and $\kappa_v$ is the local Kummer map

$$B_v(K_v)/f(A_v(K_v))\rightarrow H^1(G_{K_v},A_v[f]).$$

Note that $H^1(G_{K_v},A_v[f])/\operatorname{im}(\kappa_v)$ is isomorphic to $H^1(G_{K_v},A_v)[f]$. Geometrically, the principal homogeneous spaces coming from elements of the Selmer group have $K_v$-rational points for all places $v$ of $K$. The Selmer group is finite. This implies that the part of the Tate–Shafarevich group killed by f is finite due to the following exact sequence

$0 \to B(K)/f(A(K)) \to \operatorname{Sel}^{(2)}(A/K) \to\;$Ш(A/K) $\,\to 0$

The Selmer group in the middle of this exact sequence is finite and effectively computable. This implies the weak Mordell–Weil theorem, which states that its subgroup $B(K)/f(A(K))$ is finite. There is a notorious problem about whether this subgroup can be effectively computed: there is a procedure for computing it that will terminate with the correct answer if there is some prime $p$ such that the $p$-component of the Tate–Shafarevich group is finite. It is conjectured that the Tate–Shafarevich group is in fact finite, in which case any prime $p$ would work. However, if (as seems unlikely) the Tate–Shafarevich group has an infinite $p$-component for every prime $p$, then the procedure may never terminate.

Ralph Greenberg (1994) has generalized the notion of Selmer group to more general $p$-adic Galois representations and to $p$-adic variations of motives in the context of Iwasawa theory.

== Selmer group of a Galois module ==
More generally one can define the Selmer group of a Galois module $M$ (such as the kernel of an isogeny) as the elements of $H^1(G_K,M)$ that have images inside certain given subgroups of $H^1(G_{K_v},M)$.

== History ==
In his 1954 paper A Conjecture Concerning Rational Points On Cubic Curves, Selmer investigates generators for the rational points on certain cubic curves using two descents. He notes that a method used by Cassels points to an insufficiency in the methods of detecting generators used previously by Selmer. However, the method of Cassels is also insufficient to detect all generators. Selmer examines the situation numerically, and formulates the conjecture:

When a second descent exists, the number of generators found is an even number less than what is indicated by the first descent.

Cassels explores the situation in a series of eight papers, beginning in 1959 with Arithmetic on curves of genus 1: I. On a conjecture of Selmer. In the (1962) third paper in the series, Arithmetic on curves of genus 1. III. The Tate–Šafarevič and Selmer groups, Cassels remarks:

We shall call it a Selmer group because Selmer initiated the present work.

And thus we have the Selmer groups.

== See also ==
- Wiles's proof of Fermat's Last Theorem
