= Victor Kolyvagin =

Russian mathematician (born 1955)

- Education: Moscow State University
- Scientific career
- Fields: Mathematics
- Workplaces: Johns Hopkins University; CUNY Graduate Center
- Doctoral advisor: Yuri Manin

Victor Alexandrovich Kolyvagin (Russian: Виктор Александрович Колывагин, born 11 March, 1955) is a Russian mathematician who wrote a series of papers on Euler systems, leading to breakthroughs on the Birch and Swinnerton-Dyer conjecture, and Iwasawa's conjecture for cyclotomic fields. His work also influenced Andrew Wiles's work on Fermat's Last Theorem.

== Career ==
Kolyvagin received his Ph.D. in Mathematics in 1981 from Moscow State University, where his advisor was Yuri I. Manin. He then worked at Steklov Institute of Mathematics in Moscow until 1994. Since 1994 he has been a professor of mathematics in the United States. He was a professor at Johns Hopkins University until 2002 when he became the first person to hold the Mina Rees Chair in mathematics at the Graduate Center of the City University of New York.

== Awards ==
In 1990 he received the Chebyshev Prize of the USSR Academy of Sciences.

== Link ==
- Victor Kolyvagin at the Mathematics Genealogy Project
- Kolyvagin's Biography
