= Ralph Greenberg =

American mathematician (born 1944)

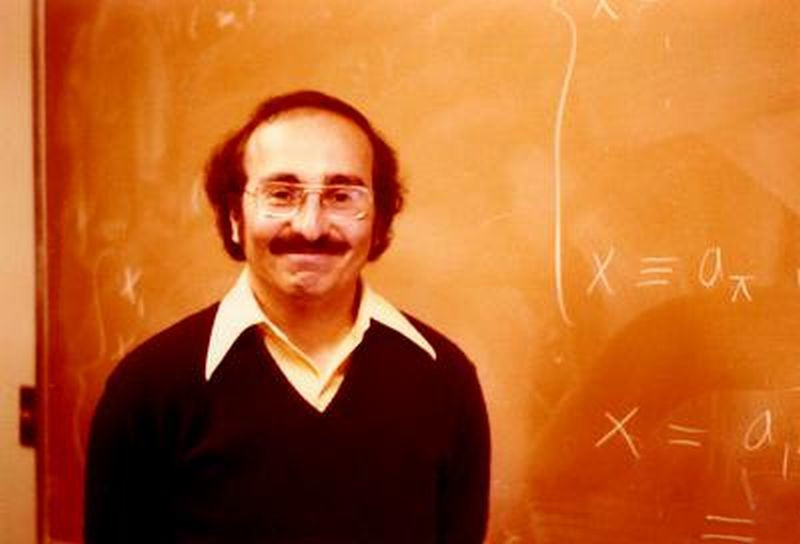
- Born: 1944 (age 81–82); Chester, Pennsylvania
- Education: University of Pennsylvania; Princeton University
- Scientific career
- Fields: Mathematics
- Workplaces: University of Washington
- Doctoral advisor: Kenkichi Iwasawa

Ralph Greenberg (born 1944) is an American mathematician who has made contributions to number theory, in particular Iwasawa theory.

He was born in Chester, Pennsylvania and studied at the University of Pennsylvania, earning a B.A. in 1966, after which he attended Princeton University, earning his doctorate in 1971 under the supervision of Kenkichi Iwasawa.

Greenberg's results include a proof (joint with Glenn Stevens) of the Mazur–Tate–Teitelbaum conjecture as well as a formula for the derivative of a p-adic Dirichlet L-function at $s=0$ (joint with Bruce Ferrero). Greenberg is also well known for his many conjectures. In his PhD thesis, he conjectured that the Iwasawa μ- and λ-invariants of the cyclotomic $\Z_p$-extension of a totally real field are zero, a conjecture that remains open as of September 2012. In the 1980s, he introduced the notion of a Selmer group for a p-adic Galois representation and generalized the "main conjectures" of Iwasawa and Barry Mazur to this setting. He has since generalized this setup to present Iwasawa theory as the theory of p-adic deformations of motives. He also provided an arithmetic theory of L-invariants generalizing his aforementioned work with Stevens.

Greenberg was an invited speaker in International Congress of Mathematicians 2010, Hyderabad on the topic of "Number Theory."

In 2012, he became a fellow of the American Mathematical Society.

In the late 1990s and early 2000s, Greenberg publicly disputed NASA conspiracy theorist and pseudoscientist Richard C. Hoagland's mathematical interpretations of the so-called "D&M Pyramid" and surrounding features found on the Cydonia Planitia region of Mars as being conclusive signs of extraterrestrial intelligence and challenged him to a public debate. Hoagland has yet to respond.
