= Ritabrata Munshi =

Indian mathematician (born 1976)

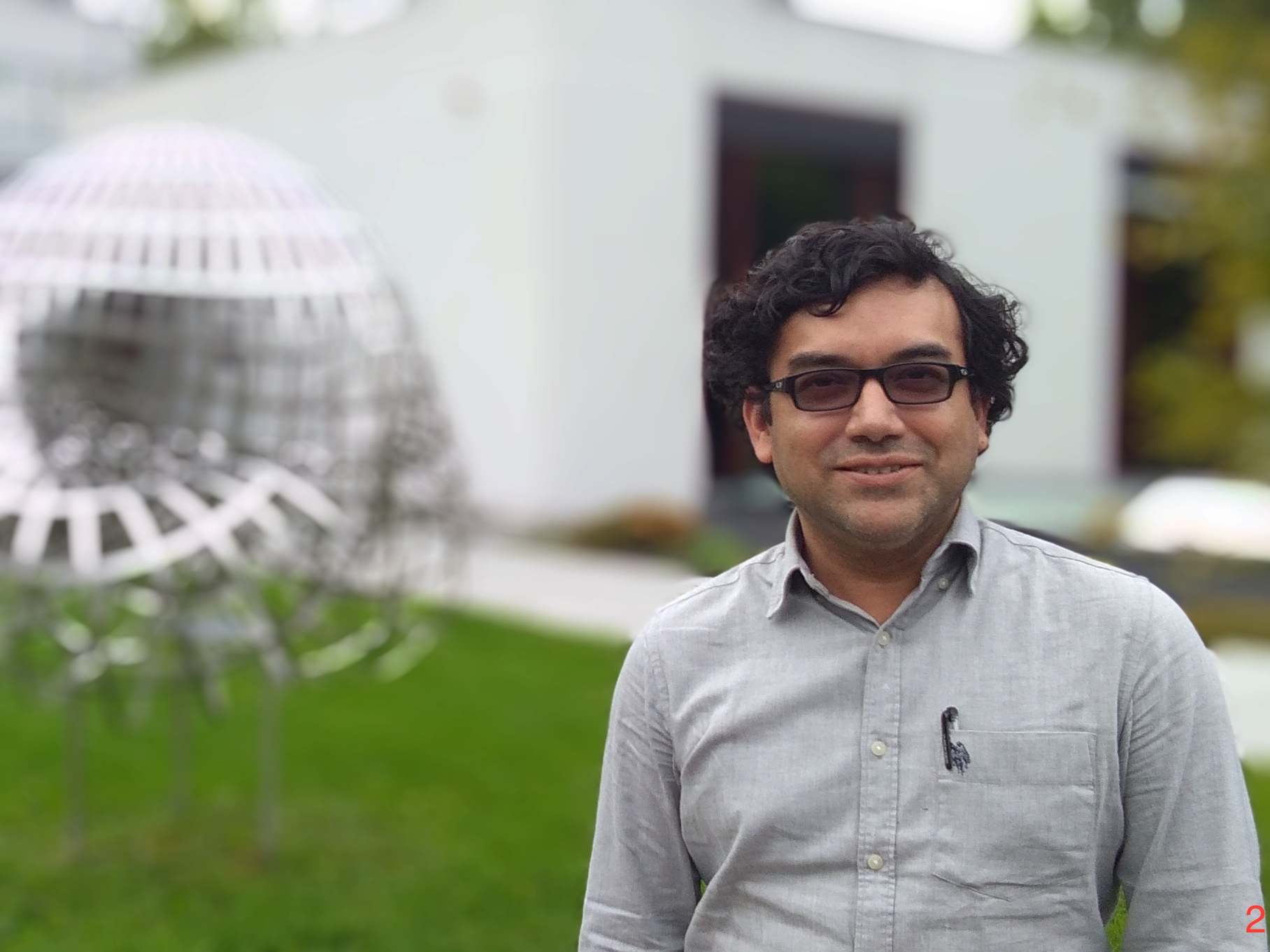
Munshi at Oberwolfach

Ritabrata Munshi (born 14 September 1976 in Calcutta (Kolkata), West Bengal) is an Indian mathematician specialising in number theory. He was awarded the Shanti Swarup Bhatnagar Prize for Science and Technology, the highest science award in India, for the year 2015 in mathematical science category.

He is known for his contributions to the sub-convexity problem for automorphic L-functions. In a series of papers published in 2015 he introduced a new approach, based on the circle method, and was able to establish sub-convex bounds for genuine degree three L-functions. Later he extended his method to the case of GL(3)xGL(2) Rankin-Selberg convolutions. These cases were earlier considered beyond the reach of known techniques.

He is affiliated to Tata Institute of Fundamental Research, Mumbai, and the Indian Statistical Institute, Kolkata. Munshi obtained PhD degree from Princeton University in 2006 under the guidance of Andrew John Wiles. After that he was a Hill Assistant Professor at the Rutgers University and worked with Henryk Iwaniec. During 2009–2010 he was a member at the Institute for Advanced Study, Princeton.

Munshi was awarded the Swarna-Jayanti fellowship by the Department of Science and Technology, Government of India in 2012. He also received the B.M. Birla Science prize in 2013, and was elected a fellow of the Indian Academy of Sciences in 2016. For his outstanding contributions to analytic aspects of number theory, he was awarded the Infosys Prize 2017 in Mathematical Sciences. On 8 November 2018 he was awarded the ICTP Ramanujan Prize in a ceremony held at the Budinich Lecture Hall, ICTP. In 2018 he was an invited speaker at the International Congress of Mathematicians (ICM). In both 2018 and 2019, he was named a laureate of the Asian Scientist 100 by the Asian Scientist. He was elected a fellow of the Indian National Science Academy in 2020.

He serves in the editorial board of The Journal of the Ramanujan Mathematical Society and the Hardy-Ramanujan journal.
