= Classical modular curve =

Plane algebraic curve

In number theory, the classical modular curve is an irreducible plane algebraic curve given by an equation

Φ_{n}(x, y) = 0,

such that (x, y) = (j(nτ), j(τ)) is a point on the curve. Here j(τ) denotes the j-invariant.

The curve is sometimes called X_{0}(n), though often that notation is used for the abstract algebraic curve for which there exist various models. A related object is the classical modular polynomial, a polynomial in one variable defined as Φ_{n}(x, x).

The classical modular curves are part of the larger theory of modular curves. In particular it has another expression as a compactified quotient of the complex upper half-plane H.

== Geometry of the modular curve ==
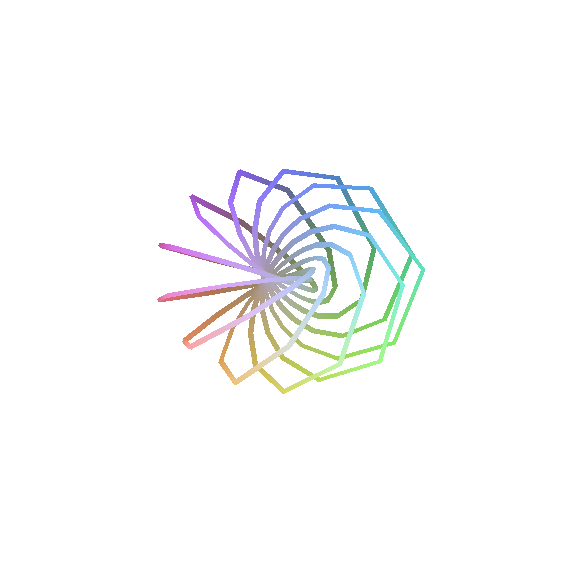
Knot at infinity of X_{0}(11)

The classical modular curve, which we will call X_{0}(n), is of degree greater than or equal to 2n when n > 1, with equality if and only if n is a prime. The polynomial Φ_{n} has integer coefficients, and hence is defined over every field. However, the coefficients are sufficiently large that computational work with the curve can be difficult. As a polynomial in x with coefficients in Z[y], it has degree ψ(n), where ψ is the Dedekind psi function. Since Φ_{n}(x, y) = Φ_{n}(y, x), X_{0}(n) is symmetrical around the line y = x, and has singular points at the repeated roots of the classical modular polynomial, where it crosses itself in the complex plane. These are not the only singularities, and in particular when n > 2, there are two singularities at infinity, where x = 0, y = ∞ and x = ∞, y = 0, which have only one branch and hence have a knot invariant which is a true knot, and not just a link.

== Parametrization of the modular curve ==
For n = 1, 2, 3, 4, 5, 6, 7, 8, 9, 10, 12, 13, 16, 18, or 25, X_{0}(n) has genus zero, and hence can be parametrized by rational functions. The simplest nontrivial example is X_{0}(2), where:

$$j_2(q)= q^{-1} - 24 + 276q -2048q^2 + 11202q^3 + \cdots =\left (\frac{\eta(q)}{\eta(q^2)} \right)^{24}$$

is (up to the constant term) the McKay–Thompson series for the class 2B of the Monster, and η is the Dedekind eta function, then

$$x = \frac{(j_2+256)^3}{j_2^2},$$
$$y = \frac{(j_2+16)^3}{j_2}$$

parametrizes X_{0}(2) in terms of rational functions of j_{2}. It is not necessary to actually compute j_{2} to use this parametrization; it can be taken as an arbitrary parameter.

== Mappings ==
A curve C, over Q is called a modular curve if for some n there exists a surjective morphism φ : X_{0}(n) → C, given by a rational map with integer coefficients. The famous modularity theorem tells us that all elliptic curves over Q are modular.

Mappings also arise in connection with X_{0}(n) since points on it correspond to some n-isogenous pairs of elliptic curves. An isogeny between two elliptic curves is a non-trivial morphism of varieties (defined by a rational map) between the curves which also respects the group laws, and hence which sends the point at infinity (serving as the identity of the group law) to the point at infinity. Such a map is always surjective and has a finite kernel, the order of which is the degree of the isogeny. Points on X_{0}(n) correspond to pairs of elliptic curves admitting an isogeny of degree n with cyclic kernel.

When X_{0}(n) has genus one, it will itself be isomorphic to an elliptic curve, which will have the same j-invariant.

For instance, X_{0}(11) has j-invariant −2^{12}11^{−5}31^{3}, and is isomorphic to the curve y^{2} + y = x^{3} − x^{2} − 10x − 20. If we substitute this value of j for y in X_{0}(5), we obtain two rational roots and a factor of degree four. The two rational roots correspond to isomorphism classes of curves with rational coefficients which are 5-isogenous to the above curve, but not isomorphic, having a different function field. Specifically, we have the six rational points: x=-122023936/161051, y=-4096/11, x=-122023936/161051, y=-52893159101157376/11, and x=-4096/11, y=-52893159101157376/11, plus the three points exchanging x and y, all on X_{0}(5), corresponding to the six isogenies between these three curves.

If in the curve y^{2} + y = x^{3} − x^{2} − 10x − 20, isomorphic to X_{0}(11) we substitute

$$x \mapsto \frac{x^5-2x^4+3x^3-2x+1}{x^2(x-1)^2}$$
$$y \mapsto y-\frac{(2y+1)(x^4+x^3-3x^2+3x-1)}{x^3(x-1)^3}$$

and factor, we get an extraneous factor of a rational function of x, and the curve y^{2} + y = x^{3} − x^{2}, with j-invariant −2^{12}11^{−1}. Hence both curves are modular of level 11, having mappings from X_{0}(11).

By a theorem of Henri Carayol, if an elliptic curve E is modular then its conductor, an isogeny invariant described originally in terms of cohomology, is the smallest integer n such that there exists a rational mapping φ : X_{0}(n) → E. Since we now know all elliptic curves over Q are modular, we also know that the conductor is simply the level n of its minimal modular parametrization.

== Galois theory of the modular curve ==
The Galois theory of the modular curve was investigated by Erich Hecke. Considered as a polynomial in x with coefficients in Z[y], the modular equation Φ_{0}(n) is a polynomial of degree ψ(n) in x, whose roots generate a Galois extension of Q(y). In the case of X_{0}(p) with p prime, where the characteristic of the field is not p, the Galois group of Q(x, y)/Q(y) is PGL(2, p), the projective general linear group of linear fractional transformations of the projective line of the field of p elements, which has p + 1 points, the degree of X_{0}(p).

This extension contains an algebraic extension F/Q where if $p^* = (-1)^{(p-1)/2}p$ in the notation of Gauss then:

$$F = \mathbf{Q}\left(\sqrt{p^*}\right).$$

If we extend the field of constants to be F, we now have an extension with Galois group PSL(2, p), the projective special linear group of the field with p elements, which is a finite simple group. By specializing y to a specific field element, we can, outside of a thin set, obtain an infinity of examples of fields with Galois group PSL(2, p) over F, and PGL(2, p) over Q.

When n is not a prime, the Galois groups can be analyzed in terms of the factors of n as a wreath product.

== See also ==
- J-invariant
- Modular curve
- Modular function
