= John H. Coates =

Australian mathematician (1945–2022)

John H. Coates FRS
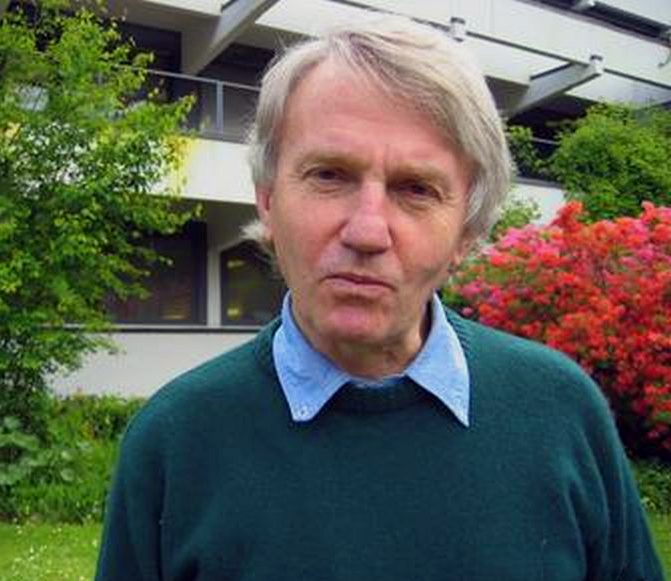
- Coates in 2006
- Born: John Henry Coates; 26 January 1945; Possum Brush, New South Wales, Australia
- Died: 9 May 2022 (aged 77); Cambridge, England
- Education: Australian National University (BSc); Trinity College, Cambridge (PhD)
- Known for: Iwasawa theory; p-adic L-functions
- Spouse: Julie Turner
- Awards: FRS (1985); Senior Whitehead Prize (1997)
- Scientific career
- Fields: Mathematics
- Workplaces: University of Cambridge; Harvard University; Université de Paris, Orsay; École Normale Supérieure; Stanford University
- Thesis: The Effective Solution of Some Diophantine Equations (1969)
- Doctoral advisor: Alan Baker
- Doctoral students: Pierre Colmez; Matthias Flach; Catherine Goldstein; Mahesh Kakde; Bernadette Perrin-Riou; Susan Howson; Anupam Saikia; Gergely Zábrádi; Leila Schneps; Jacques Tilouine; Otmar Venjakob; Andrew Wiles; Sarah Zerbes
- Website: dpmms.cam.ac.uk/people/jhc13

John Henry Coates FRS (26 January 1945 – 9 May 2022) was an Australian mathematician who was the Sadleirian professor of pure mathematics at the University of Cambridge in the United Kingdom from 1986 to 2012.

== Early life and education ==
Coates was born the son of J. H. Coates and B. L. Lee on 26 January 1945 and grew up in Possum Brush (near Taree) in New South Wales, Australia. Coates Road in Possum Brush is named after the family farm on which he grew up. Before university he spent a summer working for BHP in Newcastle, New South Wales, though he was not successful in gaining a university scholarship with the company. Coates attended Australian National University on scholarship as one of the first undergraduates, from which he gained a BSc degree. He then moved to France, doing further study at the École Normale Supérieure in Paris, before moving again, this time to England.

== Career ==
In England he did postgraduate research at the University of Cambridge, his doctoral dissertation being on p-adic analogues of Baker's method. In 1969, Coates was appointed assistant professor of mathematics at Harvard University in the United States, before moving again in 1972 to Stanford University where he became an associate professor.

In 1975, he returned to England, where he was made a fellow of Emmanuel College, and took up a lectureship. Here he supervised the PhD of Andrew Wiles, and together they proved a partial case of the Birch and Swinnerton-Dyer conjecture for elliptic curves with complex multiplication.

In 1977, Coates moved back to Australia, becoming a professor at the Australian National University, where he had been an undergraduate. The following year, he moved back to France, taking up a professorship at the University of Paris XI at Orsay. In 1985, he returned to the École Normale Supérieure, this time as professor and director of mathematics.

From 1986 until his death, Coates worked in the Department of Pure Mathematics and Mathematical Statistics (DPMMS) of the University of Cambridge. He was head of DPMMS from 1991 to 1997.

His research interests included Iwasawa theory, number theory and arithmetical algebraic geometry.

He served on the Mathematical Sciences jury for the Infosys Prize in 2009.

== Awards and honours ==
Coates was elected a fellow of the Royal Society of London in 1985, and was President of the London Mathematical Society from 1988 to 1990. The latter organisation awarded him the Senior Whitehead Prize in 1997, for "his fundamental research in number theory and for his many contributions to mathematical life both in the UK and internationally". His nomination for the Royal Society reads:

Distinguished for his contributions to the theory of numbers, in particular to the study of transcendence, cyclotomic fields and elliptic curves. In addition to his own important contributions he has been a stimulating influence on colleagues and students. Together with his pupil A. Wiles he achieved the first major breakthrough towards a proof of the Birch-Swinnerton-Dyer conjectures.

== Personal life and death ==
Coates married Julie Turner in 1966, with whom he had three sons. He collected Japanese pottery and porcelain. He died at his home in Cambridge, on 9 May 2022, at the age of 77.
