= Fred Diamond =

American mathematician (1964-)

- Born: November 19, 1964 (age 61)
- Education: University of Michigan (B.A.); Princeton University (PhD)
- Known for: Number Theory
- Awards: AMS Centennial Fellowship
- Scientific career
- Fields: Mathematics
- Workplaces: King's College London; Columbia University; Massachusetts Institute of Technology; Rutgers University; Institute for Advanced Study, Princeton; Brandeis University; Institut des Hautes Études Scientifiques
- Doctoral advisor: Andrew Wiles

Fred Irvin Diamond (born November 19, 1964) is a mathematician, known for his role in proving the modularity theorem for elliptic curves. His research interest is in modular forms and Galois representations.

== Life ==
Diamond received his B.A. from the University of Michigan in 1984, and received his Ph.D. in mathematics from Princeton University in 1988 as a doctoral student of Andrew Wiles. He has held positions at Brandeis University and Rutgers University, and is currently a professor at King's College London.

Diamond is the author of several research papers, and is also a coauthor along with Jerry Shurman of A First Course in Modular Forms, in the Graduate Texts in Mathematics series published by Springer-Verlag.
