= Semistable abelian variety =

In algebraic geometry, a semistable abelian variety is an abelian variety defined over a global or local field, which is characterized by how it reduces at the primes of the field.

For an abelian variety $A$ defined over a field $F$ with ring of integers $R$, consider the Néron model of $A$, which is a 'best possible' model of $A$ defined over $R$. This model may be represented as a scheme over $\mathrm{Spec}(R)$ (cf. spectrum of a ring) for which the generic fibre constructed by means of the morphism $\mathrm{Spec}(F) \to \mathrm{Spec}(R)$ gives back $A$. The Néron model is a smooth group scheme, so we can consider $A^0$, the connected component of the Néron model which contains the identity for the group law. This is an open subgroup scheme of the Néron model. For a residue field $k$, $A^0_k$ is a group variety over $k$, hence an extension of an abelian variety by a linear group. If this linear group is an algebraic torus, so that $A^0_k$ is a semiabelian variety, then $A$ has semistable reduction at the prime corresponding to $k$. If $F$ is a global field, then $A$ is semistable if it has good or semistable reduction at all primes.

The fundamental semistable reduction theorem of Alexander Grothendieck states that an abelian variety acquires semistable reduction over a finite extension of $F$.

== Semistable elliptic curve ==
A semistable elliptic curve may be described more concretely as an elliptic curve that has bad reduction only of multiplicative type. Suppose E is an elliptic curve defined over the rational number field $\mathbb{Q}$. It is known that there is a finite, non-empty set S of prime numbers p for which E has bad reduction modulo p. The latter means that the curve $E_p$ obtained by reduction of E to the prime field with p elements has a singular point. Roughly speaking, the condition of multiplicative reduction amounts to saying that the singular point is a double point, rather than a cusp. Deciding whether this condition holds is effectively computable by Tate's algorithm. Therefore, in a given case it is decidable whether or not the reduction is semistable, namely multiplicative reduction at worst.

The semistable reduction theorem for E may also be made explicit: E acquires semistable reduction over the extension of F generated by the coordinates of the points of order 12.
