= Galois representation =

Mathematical terminology

In mathematics, a Galois module is a G-module, with G being the Galois group (named for Évariste Galois) of some extension of fields. The term Galois representation is frequently used when the G-module is a vector space over a field or a free module over a ring in representation theory, but can also be used as a synonym for G-module. The study of Galois modules for extensions of local or global fields and their group cohomology is an important tool in number theory.

== Examples ==
- Given a field K, the multiplicative group (K^{s})^{×} of a separable closure of K is a Galois module for the absolute Galois group. Its second cohomology group is isomorphic to the Brauer group of K (by Hilbert's theorem 90, its first cohomology group is zero).
- If X is a smooth proper scheme over a field K then the ℓ-adic cohomology groups of its geometric fibre are Galois modules for the absolute Galois group of K.

=== Ramification theory ===
Let K be a valued field (with valuation denoted v) and let L/K be a finite Galois extension with Galois group G. For an extension w of v to L, let I_{w} denote its inertia group. A Galois module ρ : G → Aut(V) is said to be unramified if ρ(I_{w}) = {1}.

== Galois module structure of algebraic integers ==
In classical algebraic number theory, let L be a Galois extension of a field K, and let G be the corresponding Galois group. Then the ring O_{L} of algebraic integers of L can be considered as an O_{K}[G]-module, and one can ask what its structure is. This is an arithmetic question, in that by the normal basis theorem one knows that L is a free K[G]-module of rank 1. If the same is true for the integers, that is equivalent to the existence of a normal integral basis, i.e. of α in O_{L} such that its conjugate elements under G give a free basis for O_{L} over O_{K}. This is an interesting question even (perhaps especially) when K is the rational number field Q.

For example, if L = Q(√−3), is there a normal integral basis? The answer is yes, as one sees by identifying it with Q(ζ) where

ζ = exp(2πi/3).

In fact all the subfields of the cyclotomic fields for p-th roots of unity for p a prime number have normal integral bases (over Z), as can be deduced from the theory of Gaussian periods (the Hilbert–Speiser theorem). On the other hand, the Gaussian field does not. This is an example of a necessary condition found by Emmy Noether (perhaps known earlier?). What matters here is tame ramification. In terms of the discriminant D of L, and taking still K = Q, no prime p must divide D to the power p. Then Noether's theorem states that tame ramification is necessary and sufficient for O_{L} to be a projective module over Z[G]. It is certainly therefore necessary for it to be a free module. It leaves the question of the gap between free and projective, for which a large theory has now been built up.

A classical result, based on a result of David Hilbert, is that a tamely ramified abelian number field has a normal integral basis. This may be seen by using the Kronecker–Weber theorem to embed the abelian field into a cyclotomic field.

== Galois representations in number theory ==
Many objects that arise in number theory are naturally Galois representations. For example, if L is a Galois extension of a number field K, the ring of integers O_{L} of L is a Galois module over O_{K} for the Galois group of L/K (see Hilbert–Speiser theorem). If K is a local field, the multiplicative group of its separable closure is a module for the absolute Galois group of K and its study leads to local class field theory. For global class field theory, the union of the idele class groups of all finite separable extensions of K is used instead.

There are also Galois representations that arise from auxiliary objects and can be used to study Galois groups. An important family of examples are the ℓ-adic Tate modules of abelian varieties.

=== Artin representations ===
Let K be a number field. Emil Artin introduced a class of Galois representations of the absolute Galois group G_{K} of K, now called Artin representations. These are the continuous finite-dimensional linear representations of G_{K} on complex vector spaces. Artin's study of these representations led him to formulate the Artin reciprocity law and conjecture what is now called the Artin conjecture concerning the holomorphy of Artin L-functions.

Because of the incompatibility of the profinite topology on G_{K} and the usual (Euclidean) topology on complex vector spaces, the image of an Artin representation is always finite .

=== ℓ-adic representations ===
Let ℓ be a prime number. An ℓ-adic representation of G_{K} is a continuous group homomorphism ρ : G_{K} → Aut(M) where M is either a finite-dimensional vector space over Q̅_{ℓ} (the algebraic closure of the ℓ-adic numbers Q_{ℓ}) or a finitely generated Z̅_{ℓ}-module (where Z̅_{ℓ} is the integral closure of Z_{ℓ} in Q̅_{ℓ}). The first examples to arise were the ℓ-adic cyclotomic character and the ℓ-adic Tate modules of abelian varieties over K. Other examples come from the Galois representations of modular forms and automorphic forms, and the Galois representations on ℓ-adic cohomology groups of algebraic varieties.

Unlike Artin representations, ℓ-adic representations can have infinite image. For example, the image of G_{Q} under the ℓ-adic cyclotomic character is $\mathbf{Z}_\ell^\times$. ℓ-adic representations with finite image are often called Artin representations. Via an isomorphism of Q̅_{ℓ} with C they can be identified with bona fide Artin representations.

=== Mod ℓ representations ===
These are representations over a finite field of characteristic ℓ. They often arise as the reduction mod ℓ of an ℓ-adic representation.

=== Local conditions on representations ===
There are numerous conditions on representations given by some property of the representation restricted to a decomposition group of some prime. The terminology for these conditions is somewhat chaotic, with different authors inventing different names for the same condition and using the same name with different meanings. Some of these conditions include:

- Abelian representations. This means that the image of the Galois group in the representations is abelian.
- Absolutely irreducible representations. These remain irreducible over an algebraic closure of the field.
- Barsotti–Tate representations. These are similar to finite flat representations.
- Crystabelline representations
- Crystalline representations.
- de Rham representations.
- Finite flat representations. (This name is a little misleading, as they are really profinite rather than finite.) These can be constructed as a projective limit of representations of the Galois group on a finite flat group scheme.
- Good representations. These are related to the representations of elliptic curves with good reduction.
- Hodge–Tate representations.
- Irreducible representations. These are irreducible in the sense that the only subrepresentation is the whole space or zero.
- Minimally ramified representations.
- Modular representations. These are representations coming from a modular form, but can also refer to representations over fields of positive characteristic.
- Ordinary representations. These are related to the representations of elliptic curves with ordinary (non-supersingular) reduction. More precisely, they are 2-dimensional representations that are reducible with a 1-dimensional subrepresentation, such that the inertia group acts in a certain way on the submodule and the quotient. The exact condition depends on the author; for example it might act trivially on the quotient and by the character ε on the submodule.
- Potentially something representations. This means that the representations restricted to an open subgroup of finite index has some specified property.
- Reducible representations. These have a proper non-zero sub-representation.
- Semistable representations. These are two dimensional representations related to the representations coming from semistable elliptic curves.
- Tamely ramified representations. These are trivial on the (first) ramification group.
- Trianguline representations.
- Unramified representations. These are trivial on the inertia group.
- Wildly ramified representations. These are non-trivial on the (first) ramification group.

== Representations of the Weil group ==
If K is a local or global field, the theory of class formations attaches to K its Weil group W_{K}, a continuous group homomorphism φ : W_{K} → G_{K}, and an isomorphism of topological groups

$$r_K:C_K\tilde{\rightarrow}W_K^{\text{ab}}$$

where C_{K} is K^{×} or the idele class group I_{K}/K^{×} (depending on whether K is local or global) and W ab
K is the abelianization of the Weil group of K. Via φ, any representation of G_{K} can be considered as a representation of W_{K}. However, W_{K} can have strictly more representations than G_{K}. For example, via r_{K} the continuous complex characters of W_{K} are in bijection with those of C_{K}. Thus, the absolute value character on C_{K} yields a character of W_{K} whose image is infinite and therefore is not a character of G_{K} (as all such have finite image).

An ℓ-adic representation of W_{K} is defined in the same way as for G_{K}. These arise naturally from geometry: if X is a smooth projective variety over K, then the ℓ-adic cohomology of the geometric fibre of X is an ℓ-adic representation of G_{K} which, via φ, induces an ℓ-adic representation of W_{K}. If K is a local field of residue characteristic p ≠ ℓ, then it is simpler to study the so-called Weil–Deligne representations of W_{K}.

=== Weil–Deligne representations ===
Let K be a local field. Let E be a field of characteristic zero. A Weil–Deligne representation over E of W_{K} (or simply of K) is a pair (r, N) consisting of

- a continuous group homomorphism r : W_{K} → Aut_{E}(V), where V is a finite-dimensional vector space over E equipped with the discrete topology,
- a nilpotent endomorphism N : V → V such that r(w)Nr(w)^{−1}= ||w||N for all w ∈ W_{K}.

These representations are the same as the representations over E of the Weil–Deligne group of K.

If the residue characteristic of K is different from ℓ, Grothendieck's ℓ-adic monodromy theorem sets up a bijection between ℓ-adic representations of W_{K} (over Q̅_{ℓ}) and Weil–Deligne representations of W_{K} over Q̅_{ℓ} (or equivalently over C). These latter have the nice feature that the continuity of r is only with respect to the discrete topology on V, thus making the situation more algebraic in flavor.

== See also ==
- Compatible system of ℓ-adic representations
- Arboreal Galois representation
