= Iwasawa theory =

Study of objects of arithmetic interest over infinite towers of number fields

In number theory, Iwasawa theory is the study of objects of arithmetic interest over infinite towers of number fields. It began as a Galois module theory of ideal class groups, initiated by Kenkichi Iwasawa (1959) (岩澤 健吉), as part of the theory of cyclotomic fields. In the early 1970s, Barry Mazur considered generalizations of Iwasawa theory to abelian varieties. More recently (early 1990s), Ralph Greenberg has proposed an Iwasawa theory for motives.

== Formulation ==
Iwasawa worked with so-called $\Z_p$-extensions: infinite extensions of a number field $F$ with Galois group $\Gamma$ isomorphic to the additive group of p-adic integers for some prime p. (These were called $\Gamma$-extensions in early papers.) Every closed subgroup of $\Gamma$ is of the form $\Gamma^{p^n},$ so by Galois theory, a $\Z_p$-extension $F_\infty/F$ is the same thing as a tower of fields

$$F=F_0 \subset F_1 \subset F_2 \subset \cdots \subset F_\infty$$

such that $\operatorname{Gal}(F_n/F)\cong \Z/p^n\Z.$ Iwasawa studied classical Galois modules over $F_n$ by asking questions about the structure of modules over $F_\infty.$

More generally, Iwasawa theory asks questions about the structure of Galois modules over extensions with Galois group a p-adic Lie group.

== Example ==
Let $p$ be a prime number and let $K=\Q(\mu_p)$ be the field generated over $\Q$ by the $p$th roots of unity. Iwasawa considered the following tower of number fields:

$$K = K_{0} \subset K_{1} \subset \cdots \subset K_{\infty},$$

where $K_n$ is the field generated by adjoining to $K$ the p^{n+1}-st roots of unity and

$$K_\infty = \bigcup K_n.$$

The fact that $\operatorname{Gal}(K_n/K)\simeq \Z/p^n\Z$ implies, by infinite Galois theory, that $\operatorname{Gal}(K_{\infty}/K) \simeq \varprojlim_n \Z/p^n\Z = \Z_p.$ In order to get an interesting Galois module, Iwasawa took the ideal class group of $K_n$, and let $I_n$ be its p-torsion part. There are norm maps $I_m\to I_n$ whenever $m>n$, and this gives us the data of an inverse system. If we set

$$I = \varprojlim I_n,$$

then it is not hard to see from the inverse limit construction that $I$ is a module over $\Z_p.$ In fact, $I$ is a module over the Iwasawa algebra $\Lambda=\Z_p[[\Gamma]]$. This is a 2-dimensional, regular local ring, and this makes it possible to describe modules over it. From this description it is possible to recover information about the p-part of the class group of $K.$

The motivation here is that the p-torsion in the ideal class group of $K$ had already been identified by Kummer as the main obstruction to the direct proof of Fermat's Last Theorem.

== Connections with p-adic analysis ==
From this beginning in the 1950s, a substantial theory has been built up. A fundamental connection was noticed between the module theory, and the p-adic L-functions that were defined in the 1960s by Kubota and Leopoldt. The latter begin from the Bernoulli numbers, and use interpolation to define p-adic analogues of the Dirichlet L-functions. It became clear that the theory had prospects of moving ahead finally from Kummer's century-old results on regular primes.

Iwasawa formulated the main conjecture of Iwasawa theory as an assertion that two methods of defining p-adic L-functions (by module theory, by interpolation) should coincide, as far as that was well-defined. This was proved by Mazur & Wiles (1984) for $\Q$ and for all totally real number fields by Wiles (1990). These proofs were modeled upon Ken Ribet's proof of the converse to Herbrand's theorem (the so-called Herbrand–Ribet theorem).

Karl Rubin found a more elementary proof of the Mazur-Wiles theorem by using Kolyvagin's Euler systems, described in Lang (1990) and Washington (1997), and later proved other generalizations of the main conjecture for imaginary quadratic fields.

== Generalizations ==
The Galois group of the infinite tower, the starting field, and the sort of arithmetic module studied can all be varied. In each case, there is a main conjecture linking the tower to a p-adic L-function.

In 2002, Christopher Skinner and Eric Urban claimed a proof of a main conjecture for GL(2). In 2010, they posted a preprint (Skinner & Urban 2010).

== See also ==
- Ferrero–Washington theorem
- Tate module of a number field
