= Greenberg's conjectures =

Two unsolved conjectures in algebraic number theory

Greenberg's conjecture is either of two conjectures in algebraic number theory proposed by Ralph Greenberg. Greenberg's general conjecture was unsolved as of 2025; Greenberg's invariants conjecture appears to have been resolved as of 2026.

== Invariants conjecture ==
The first conjecture was proposed in 1976 and concerns Iwasawa invariants. This conjecture is related to Vandiver's conjecture, Leopoldt's conjecture, and the Birch–Tate conjecture, all of which are also unsolved.

The conjecture, also referred to as Greenberg's invariants conjecture, first appeared in Greenberg's Princeton University thesis of 1971 and originally stated that, assuming that $F$ is a totally real number field and that $F_\infty/F$ is the cyclotomic $\mathbb{Z}_p$-extension, $\lambda(F_\infty/F) = \mu(F_\infty/F) = 0$, i.e. the power of $p$ dividing the class number of $F_n$ is bounded as $n \rightarrow \infty$. Note that if Leopoldt's conjecture holds for $F$ and $p$, the only $\mathbb{Z}_p$-extension of $F$ is the cyclotomic one (since it is totally real).

In 1976, Greenberg expanded the conjecture by providing more examples for it and slightly reformulated it as follows: given that $k$ is a finite extension of $\mathbf{Q}$ and that $\ell$ is a fixed prime, with consideration of subfields of cyclotomic extensions of $k$, one can define a tower of number fields $k = k_0 \subset k_1 \subset k_2 \subset \cdots \subset k_n \subset \cdots$ such that $k_n$ is a cyclic extension of $k$ of degree $\ell^n$. If $k$ is totally real, is the power of $l$ dividing the class number of $k_n$ bounded as $n \rightarrow \infty$? Now, if $k$ is an arbitrary number field, then there exist integers $\lambda$, $\mu$ and $\nu$ such that the power of $\ell$ dividing the class number of $k_n$ is $\ell^{e_n}$, where $e_n = {\lambda}n + \mu^{\ell_n} + \nu$ for all sufficiently large $n$. The integers $\lambda$, $\mu$, $\nu$ depend only on $k$ and $\ell$. Then, we ask: is $\lambda = \mu = 0$ for $k$ totally real?

Simply speaking, the conjecture asks whether we have $\mu_\ell(k) = \lambda_\ell(k) = 0$ for any totally real number field $k$ and any prime number $\ell$, or the conjecture can also be reformulated as asking whether both invariants λ and μ associated to the cyclotomic $Z_p$-extension of a totally real number field vanish.

In 2001, Greenberg generalized the conjecture (thus making it known as Greenberg's pseudo-null conjecture or, sometimes, as Greenberg's generalized conjecture):

Supposing that $F$ is a totally real number field and that $p$ is a prime, let $\tilde{F}$ denote the compositum of all $\mathbb{Z}_p$-extensions of $F$. (Recall that if Leopoldt's conjecture holds for $F$ and $p$, then $\tilde F=F_\infty$.) Let $\tilde{L}$ denote the pro-$p$ Hilbert class field of $\tilde{F}$ and let $\tilde{X} = \operatorname{Gal}(\tilde{L}/\tilde{F})$, regarded as a module over the ring $\tilde{\Lambda} = {\mathbb{Z}_p}[[\operatorname{Gal}(\tilde{F}/F)]]$. Then $\tilde{X}$ is a pseudo-null $\tilde{\Lambda}$-module.

A possible reformulation: Let $\tilde{k}$ be the compositum of all the $\mathbb{Z}_p$-extensions of $k$ and let $\operatorname{Gal}(\tilde{k}/k) \simeq \mathbb{Z}^n_p$, then $Y_\tilde{k}$ is a pseudo-null $\Lambda_n$-module.

Another related conjecture (also unsolved as of yet) exists:

We have $\mu_\ell(k) = 0$ for any number field $k$ and any prime number $\ell$.

This related conjecture was justified by Bruce Ferrero and Larry Washington, both of whom proved (see: Ferrero–Washington theorem) that $\mu_\ell(k) = 0$ for any abelian extension $k$ of the rational number field $\mathbb{Q}$ and any prime number $\ell$.

== p-rationality conjecture ==
Another conjecture, which can be referred to as Greenberg's conjecture, was proposed by Greenberg in 2016, and is known as Greenberg's $p$-rationality conjecture. It states that for any odd prime $p$ and for any $t$, there exists a $p$-rational field $K$ such that $\operatorname{Gal}(K/\mathbb{Q}) \cong (\mathbb{Z}/\mathbb{2Z})^t$. This conjecture is related to the Inverse Galois problem.
