= P-adic L-function =

Analytic function in mathematics

In mathematics, a p-adic zeta function, or more generally a p-adic L-function, is a function analogous to the Riemann zeta function, or more general L-functions, but whose domain and target are p-adic (where p is a prime number). For example, the domain could be the p-adic integers Z_{p}, a profinite p-group, or a p-adic family of Galois representations, and the image could be the p-adic numbers Q_{p} or its algebraic closure.

The source of a p-adic L-function tends to be one of two types. The first source—from which Tomio Kubota and Heinrich-Wolfgang Leopoldt gave the first construction of a p-adic L-function (Kubota & Leopoldt 1964)—is via the p-adic interpolation of special values of L-functions. For example, Kubota–Leopoldt used Kummer's congruences for Bernoulli numbers to construct a p-adic L-function, the p-adic Riemann zeta function ζ_{p}(s), whose values at negative odd integers are those of the Riemann zeta function at negative odd integers (up to an explicit correction factor). p-adic L-functions arising in this fashion are typically referred to as analytic p-adic L-functions. The other major source of p-adic L-functions—first discovered by Kenkichi Iwasawa—is from the arithmetic of cyclotomic fields, or more generally, certain Galois modules over towers of cyclotomic fields or even more general towers. A p-adic L-function arising in this way is typically called an arithmetic p-adic L-function as it encodes arithmetic data of the Galois module involved. The main conjecture of Iwasawa theory (now a theorem due to Barry Mazur and Andrew Wiles) is the statement that the Kubota–Leopoldt p-adic L-function and an arithmetic analogue constructed by Iwasawa theory are essentially the same. In more general situations where both analytic and arithmetic p-adic L-functions are constructed (or expected), the statement that they agree is called the main conjecture of Iwasawa theory for that situation. Such conjectures represent formal statements concerning the philosophy that special values of L-functions contain arithmetic information.

== Dirichlet L-functions ==
The Dirichlet L-function is given by the analytic continuation of

$$L(s,\chi) = \sum_n\frac{\chi(n)}{n^s} = \prod_{p \text{ prime}} \frac{1}{1-\chi(p)p^{-s}}$$

The Dirichlet L-function at negative integers is given by

$$L(1-n, \chi) = -\frac{B_{n,\chi}}{n}$$

where B_{n,χ} is a generalized Bernoulli number defined by

$$\displaystyle \sum_{n=0}^\infty B_{n,\chi}\frac{t^n}{n!} = \sum_{a=1}^f\frac{\chi(a)te^{at}}{e^{ft}-1}$$

for χ a Dirichlet character with conductor f.

== Definition using interpolation ==
The Kubota–Leopoldt p-adic L-function L_{p}(s, χ) interpolates the Dirichlet L-function with the Euler factor at p removed. More precisely, L_{p}(s, χ) is the unique continuous function of the p-adic number s such that

$$L_p(1-n, \chi) = \left(1-\chi(p)p^{n-1}\right) L(1-n, \chi)$$

for positive integers n divisible by p − 1. The right hand side is just the usual Dirichlet L-function, except that the Euler factor at p is removed, otherwise it would not be p-adically continuous. The continuity of the right hand side is closely related to the Kummer congruences.

When n is not divisible by p − 1 this does not usually hold; instead

$$L_p(1-n, \chi) = \left(1-\chi\omega^{-n}(p)p^{n-1}\right) L\left(1-n, \chi\omega^{-n}\right)$$

for positive integers n. Here χ is twisted by a power of the Teichmüller character ω.

== Viewed as a p-adic measure ==
p-adic L-functions can also be thought of as p-adic measures (or p-adic distributions) on p-profinite Galois groups. The translation between this point of view and the original point of view of Kubota–Leopoldt (as Q_{p}-valued functions on Z_{p}) is via the Mazur–Mellin transform (and class field theory).

== Totally real fields ==
Deligne & Ribet (1980), building upon previous work of Serre (1973), constructed analytic p-adic L-functions for totally real fields. Independently, Barsky (1978) and Cassou-Noguès (1979) did the same, but their approaches followed Takuro Shintani's approach to the study of the L-values.
