= Max Palevsky =

American philanthropist (1924–2010)

Max Palevsky (July 24, 1924 – May 5, 2010) was an American art collector, venture capitalist, philanthropist, and computer technology pioneer. He was known as a member of the Malibu Mafia – a group of wealthy American Jewish men who donated money to liberal and progressive causes and politicians.

== Early life ==
Palevsky was born in Chicago, Illinois, to Jewish immigrant parents — Izchok (Isadore) Palevsky (born May 10, 1890, in Pinsk, in the Brest Region of the Russian Empire [now in Belarus], died September 27, 1969, in Los Angeles), and Sarah Greenblatt (born May 16, 1894, died December 28, 1949, in Chicago). Izchok had arrived in Baltimore from Bremen, Germany, on the S.S. Brandenburg on March 18, 1910, while Sarah immigrated around 1916. Palevsky's parents spoke Yiddish fluently, but little English. His father, a house painter, did not have a car and had to use the Chicago streetcars to transport his equipment.

The youngest of three children, Palevsky grew up at 1925½ Hancock Street in Chicago. His older brother, Harry (September 16, 1919 — September 17, 1990), was a physicist who helped develop the atomic bomb at Los Alamos National Laboratory; his sister, Helen (born 1920), married Melvin M. Futterman (December 28, 1918 – March 14, 1989).

After graduating from public high school in Chicago, Palevsky volunteered for the US Army Air Corps as a weatherman during World War II and served from 1943 to 1946. For his training he went for a year to the University of Chicago for basic science and mathematics and Yale University for electronics. He was then sent to New Guinea, which was the Air Force's central base for electronics in the South Pacific. After the war, the GI Bill made it financially feasible for Palevsky to earn a B.S. in mathematics and a B.Ph. in philosophy from the University of Chicago in 1948. Palevsky also did graduate work in philosophy at UCLA, UC Berkeley, and the University of Chicago.

== Computers ==
After attending and resigning from a doctorate program in philosophy at UCLA, where he had served as a teaching assistant in the philosophy department, Palevsky discovered computer technology through a lecture at Caltech by John von Neumann about the advent of computer technology.

Palevsky began working in the computer industry in 1950 for $100 a week building computers at Northrop Aircraft. Between March 1950 and January 1951, he built copies of the MADIDDA, a special-purpose computer intended to solve differential equations. The MADIDDA was designed by physicist Floyd Steele, who left Northrop in 1950, a year after the MADIDDA's completion. Priced from $25,000 to $30,000, MADDIDA would prove to be the last and most sophisticated dedicated differential analyzer ever built once all attention soon turned to electronic computers.

Two years after Palevsky joined Northrop, the division was sold to Bendix Corporation. Palevsky worked at Bendix from 1952 to 1956 designing digital differential analyzers as a project engineer, working on the logic design for the company's first computer. In March 1956, Bendix offered their first digital computer, the Bendix G-15, described by some as the first personal computer (a claim that is widely disputed). Palevsky worked on the DA-1 differential analyzer option, which connected to the G-15 and resulted in a machine similar to the MADDIDA, using the G-15 to re-wire the inputs to the analyzer instead of the custom drums and wiring of the earlier machine.

In March 1957, Palevsky went on to work at Packard Bell Corporation, at a new affiliate of the company that he started, called Packard Bell Computer Corp., in a storefront at 11766 W Pico Boulevard in West Los Angeles. He was vice president and director of the new division. The new facility launched a research and development program in the digital computer field, with a staff of experienced engineers and skilled technicians to implement the new development. Palevsky convinced the company that they should enter the computer business and helped develop the first silicon computer, which became the PB 250, which was modestly successful. In April 1960, Packard-Bell Computer Corp. and Bailey Meter Co. signed an agreement for the exclusive application of PB250's in the control of power plants. As vice president and general manager of Packard Bell Computer, Palevsky supervised the building of a new 20,000 sq ft (1,900 m^{2}) building at 1935 Armacost Avenue to house the firm's expanding computer activities, for consolidation of computer and systems engineering and for needed expansion of systems as well as computer manufacturing facilities. Palevsky gave many lectures during this period, including at the second international meeting on analog computation at Strasbourg, France, in September 1958.

== Scientific Data Systems ==
Palevsky felt that ten percent of the market of small to medium size scientific and process control computers was being totally neglected. He started looking for venture capital to start a company to address this market, and through contacts from the University of Chicago was able to raise $1 million from Arthur Rock and the Rosenwald family of the Sears Roebuck fortune. He left Packard Bell with eleven associates from the computer division to found Scientific Data Systems of California in September 1961.

Within a year they introduced the SDS 910, which made the company profitable. Initially, it targeted scientific and medical computing markets. From 1962 to 1965, the company introduced seven computers, all of them commercial successes. On March 15, 1966, they introduced the Sigma 7, the first of a family of machines that marked the full-scale entry of the company into new areas of business data processing, time sharing, and multiprocessing. The Sigma 7 had business capabilities because the once-separate disciplines of business and scientific electronic data processing had developed to the point where one machine could handle both. SDS captured a little more than two per cent of the overall digital computer market in 1966 and continued to grow with the market.

Palevsky sold SDS to Xerox in May 1969 for $920 million, with Arthur Rock's assistance, at which time he became a director and chairman of the executive committee of Xerox Corporation. Palevsky's initial investment of $60,000 in SDS became nearly $100 million at the sale. He retired as a director of Xerox in May 1972.

== Politics ==
Palevsky was a prominent member of the Malibu Mafia, an informal group of wealthy American Jewish men who donated money to liberal and progressive causes and politicians during 1960s–1990s.

In 1972 Palevsky donated $319,000 to George McGovern, and in 1973 he managed Tom Bradley's first successful campaign for mayor of Los Angeles. He made numerous friends and allies on the California political scene, including former governor Gray Davis, and was elected to serve on Common Cause's National Governing Board in 1973. Many were dismayed at Palevsky's $1 million contribution in support of California Proposition 25, a campaign-finance reform initiative. He said to Newsweek: "I am making this million-dollar contribution in hopes that I will never again legally be allowed to write huge checks to California political candidates."

Despite his membership in the Malibu Mafia, Palevsky was less willing to support other Malibu Mafia members in efforts such as their fight to break up Big Oil and was absent from meetings discussing the formation of the Energy Action Committee (EAC). In 1980, Palevsky would also break with other members of the Malibu Mafia who made efforts to aid the U.S. Presidential campaigns of Ted Kennedy and John B. Anderson, and supported the re-election campaign of Jimmy Carter.

Palevsky raised funds in 2007 to help Barack Obama with the 2008 United States presidential election.

== Arts, culture, and venture capital ==
As a venture capitalist, Palevsky helped to fund many companies, including Intel, which grew to become one of the nation's leading semiconductor companies and a pioneer in the development of memory chips and microprocessors. Palevsky became a director along with Arthur Rock, who helped bankroll SDS, at the company's founding, on July 18, 1968, as NM Electronics Corporation, a name later changed to Intel (August 6, 1968). Intel was funded with $2 million in venture capital assembled by Arthur Rock. Palevsky became a director emeritus in February 1998.

Palevsky also became a director and chairman of Rolling Stone, which he rescued from financial ruin in 1970 by buying a substantial share of the stock. While on the board he became friends with the late Hunter S. Thompson, inventor of what came to be called Gonzo journalism. In December 1970, Cinema V, a movie-theater distribution operation, entered film production in a joint venture, Cinema X, with Palevsky. Palevsky went into independent production with Peter Bart, former production vice president of Paramount Pictures in November 1973, with a Paramount contract to produce six features in three years. Palevsky produced and bankrolled several Hollywood films, including Fun with Dick and Jane and Islands in the Stream both with Peter Bart in 1977, and Endurance in 1998. Author Albert Goldman dedicated his controversial 1988 biography The Lives of John Lennon to Palevsky. In June 1977, Palevsky was elected to the board of the American Ballet Theatre.

Palevsky also served as a director and chairman of the Board of Silicon Systems Inc. of Tustin, California, from April 1983 until February 1984; as chairman and chief executive of the board of Daisy Systems Corporation, a maker of computer systems used to design electronic circuits based in Mountain View, California; and, from November 1984 to 1999, as a director of Komag Corp., a Milpitas, California, based maker of data storage media.

Palevsky also collected art, particularly Japanese woodblock prints, and gave generously to establish and maintain institutions of visual art. He established the Palevsky Design Pavilion at the Israel Museum in Jerusalem. He also built an Arts & Crafts collection at the Los Angeles County Museum of Art (LACMA), and donated $1 million to help establish the Los Angeles Museum of Contemporary Art. In 2001, he promised his art holdings to LACMA, but his collection of 250 works was scheduled to be sold by Christie's in the Fall of 2010.

Max Palevsky funded the American Cinematheque's refurbishment of the Aero Theater in Santa Monica. The theater re-opened in January 2005 and bears his name.

== The University of Chicago ==
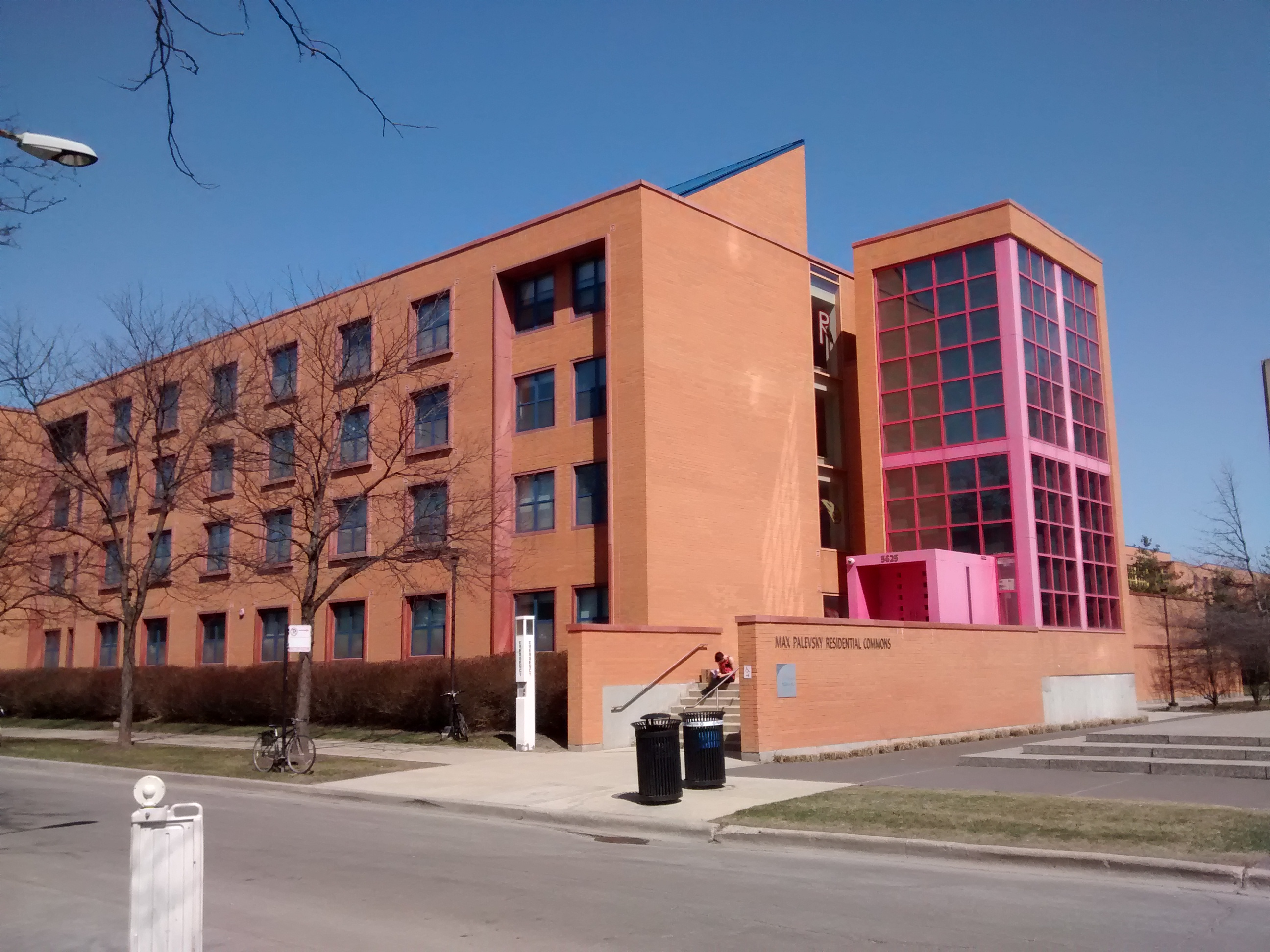
The Max Palevsky Residential Commons, a dormitory at the University of Chicago

Palevsky served as a trustee at his alma mater from 1972 to 1982. He established the Palevsky Professorship in History and Civilization in 1972 and the Palevsky Faculty Fund in 1996.

In 2000, Palevsky donated $20 million to his alma mater to enhance residential life. In 2001, the university completed construction on three large colorful dorms that are connected through tunnels and bear his name. A one-screen cinema at the university is also named after him, and is the home of Doc Films, the oldest continuously running student film association in the United States.

== Personal life ==
Palevsky was married five times and divorced four times. He had five children. He was married to his first wife, Mary Joan Yates (Joan Palevsky), from 1952 to 1968. With her huge divorce settlement, the largest at that time in California, she became a renowned philanthropist. With Max, she had two children, Madeleine and Nicholas Palevsky. Joan died in 2006. His second wife was Sara Jane Brown, whom he married on September 6, 1969. In November 1972, he married Lynda L. Edelstein, his third wife, the mother of his sons, Alexander and Jonathan Palevsky. Jodie Evans, his fourth wife and widow, is a political activist and mother of Matthew Palevsky.

Palevsky owned homes notable for their architecture, furniture, and art collections. Three California Houses: The Homes of Max Palevsky featured architecture and design by Ettore Sottsass of the Memphis group, Craig Ellwood, George Washington Smith, and Coy Howard.

In 1985 and 1988, Palevsky was named to the Forbes 400 list of wealthiest Americans. His estimated worth for those years was $600 million (1985) and $640 million (1988).

Palevsky died at the age of 85 of heart failure on May 5, 2010, at his home in Beverly Hills, California.
