= Iwasawa conjecture =

In mathematics, the Iwasawa conjecture may be:

- the main conjecture of Iwasawa theory
- the Ferrero–Washington theorem about the vanishing of Iwasawa's μ-invariant for cyclotomic extensions
