= PB 250 =

22 bit minicomputer

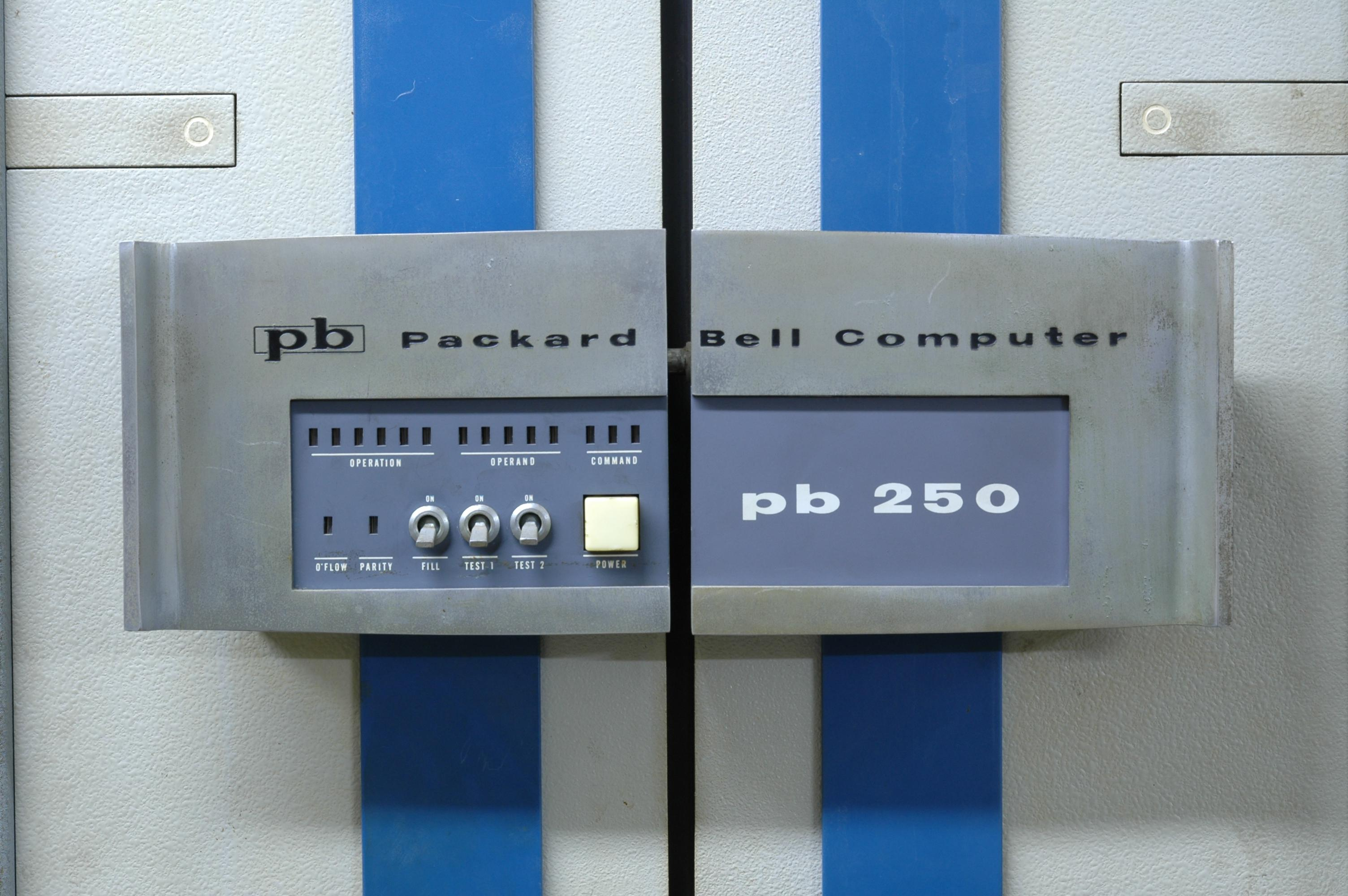
Panel of the Packard Bell Computer model PB 250

The PB 250 (later Raytheon 250) was a general-purpose computer introduced in 1960 by the Packard Bell Corporation.

== Design ==
The word size was 22 bits and the memory could be expanded to a maximum of 16,000 words. The performance was 40,000 operations per second. It had the ability to operate as an I/O processor in tandem with another computer; at the time this was considered a "radically new feature" for a less expensive system. The Central Computer weighed 110 pounds (50 kg).

The design started in November 1959. The computer was intended as a component in special purpose systems, for example, to control electric power plants. The logic design has similarities with the Bendix G-15 computer, which in turn was based on Alan Turing’s Pilot ACE. The circuits were derived from the TRICE digital differential analyzer.

People involved in development:

- Max Palevsky – general manager, started the development process.
- Stanley Frankel – consultant on the design of the computer logic
- Robert Beck – designer of the computer logic
- Smil Ruhman – circuit design
- Jack Mitchell and Donald Cooper – management and coordination of the overall engineering project

== Features ==
The PB250 used a Flexowriter as a console.

It could be operated entirely from a battery power supply.

== Software ==
- SNAP I (Symbolic Non-optimizing Assembly Program) assembler
- ATRAN (Algebraic TRANslator), process oriented language
- CINCH Interpreter, a floating point interpretive system, designed to permit rapid programming of scientific and engineering problems.
- OUP III (Octal Utility Package III) which "allowed the operator to perform certain transfer functions, printout locations of memory, store single words into memory, and begin the execution of programs that had been stored in memory."
- NELIAC compiler
- Fortran II

== Uses ==
- By WANEF (Westinghouse Astronuclear Experiment Facility), whose task was to perform basic research and reactor analysis on the NRX series of nuclear reactors to be used in nuclear rocket engine.
- In the Saturn 1 first stage checkout.
- In TRICE models TC5108/250 and TC5036/250 hybrid computers.
- In Hycomp 250 hybrid computer, later replaced by PB440.
- In nuclear submarine training systems and in antisubmarine warfare trainers.
- PB 250 was licensed to SETI (French: Société européenne de traitement de l'information, lit. 'European Information Processing Company'). It could be connected to the SETI 2000 process control system.
- In mobile (by van) monitoring and data processing services.

== Bibliography ==
- Beck, Robert Mark (30 December 1960). PB-250 – A High Speed Serial General Purpose Computer Using Magnetostrictive Delay Line Storage. International Workshop on Managing Requirements Knowledge (AFIPS). p. 283. doi:10.1109/afips.1960.58. "The first production computer was delivered in October 1960."
- "The PB 250 General Purpose Digital Computer" (PDF). Computers and Automation. Vol. 9, no. 8. August 1960. pp. 1B–3B (9–11). "... was introduced by Packard Bell Computer Corporation at the Western Joint Computer Conference in May"
- "PB-250 documents". www.bitsavers.org.
- "PB 250" (PDF). AUERBACH Standard EDP Reports. 7: 165–251.
- "Descriptions of Digital Computers" (PDF). Computers and Automation. Vol. XII, no. 6. June 1963a. pp. 72, 82.
- "A Survey of New West-European Digital Computers (Part 1): France" (PDF). Computers and Automation. Vol. XII, no. 9. September 1963b. p. 23.
- Kaisler, Stephen H. (2017). "Chapter Thirteen – Packard Bell". Birthing the Computer: From Drums to Cores. Cambridge Scholars Publishing. pp. 304–317. ISBN 978-1-4438-9625-2.
