= Packard Bell Corporation =

US electronics manufacturer founded in 1933

Packard Bell
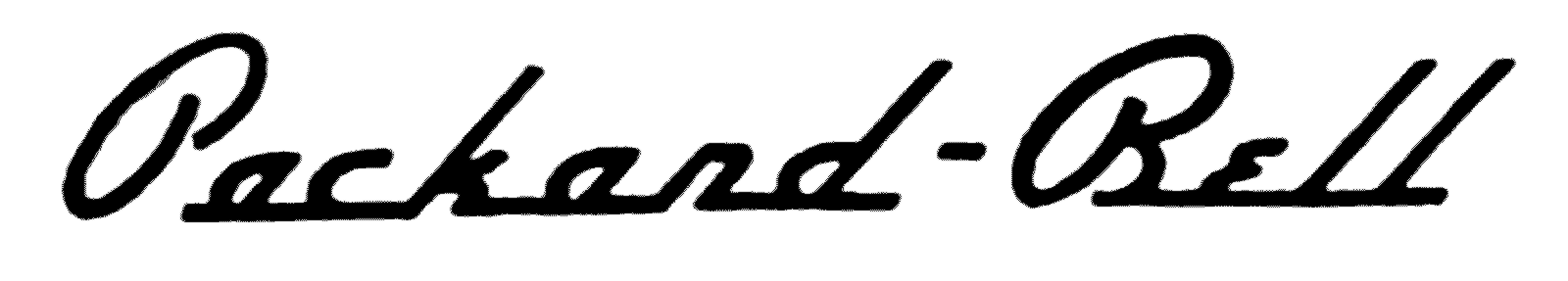

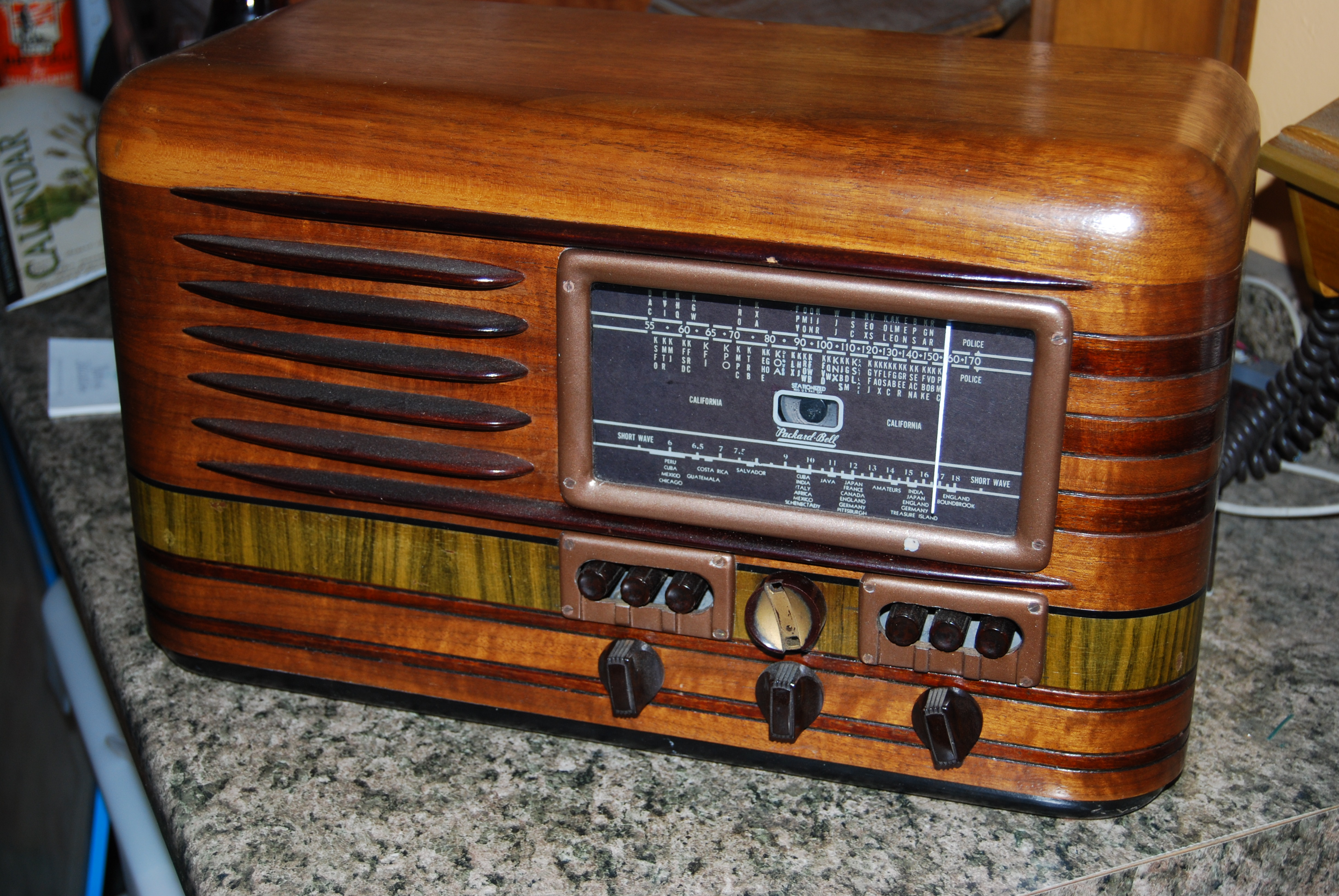
- Packard Bell Model 46H AM/SW Radio (1938)
- Industry: Consumer and military electronics
- Founded: 1933; 93 years ago
- Founder: Leon Packard and Herb Bell
- Defunct: 1968; 58 years ago
- Fate: Acquired by Teledyne Technologies
- Headquarters: Los Angeles, California, United States
- Products: Radios, televisions, and computers

Packard Bell Corporation (also known as Packard Bell Electronics or simply Packard Bell) was an American electronics manufacturer founded in 1933 by Herb Bell and Leon Packard. Initially they produced radios, but expanded into defense electronics during World War II. After the war, they began manufacturing other consumer electronics, including television receivers and high fidelity stereos. In 1957, a subsidiary of the company became involved in the manufacture of scientific and military computers. Industrial conglomerate Teledyne Technologies acquired the business in 1968. In 1986, Israeli investors bought the name for a newly formed personal computer manufacturer, Packard Bell.

== History ==
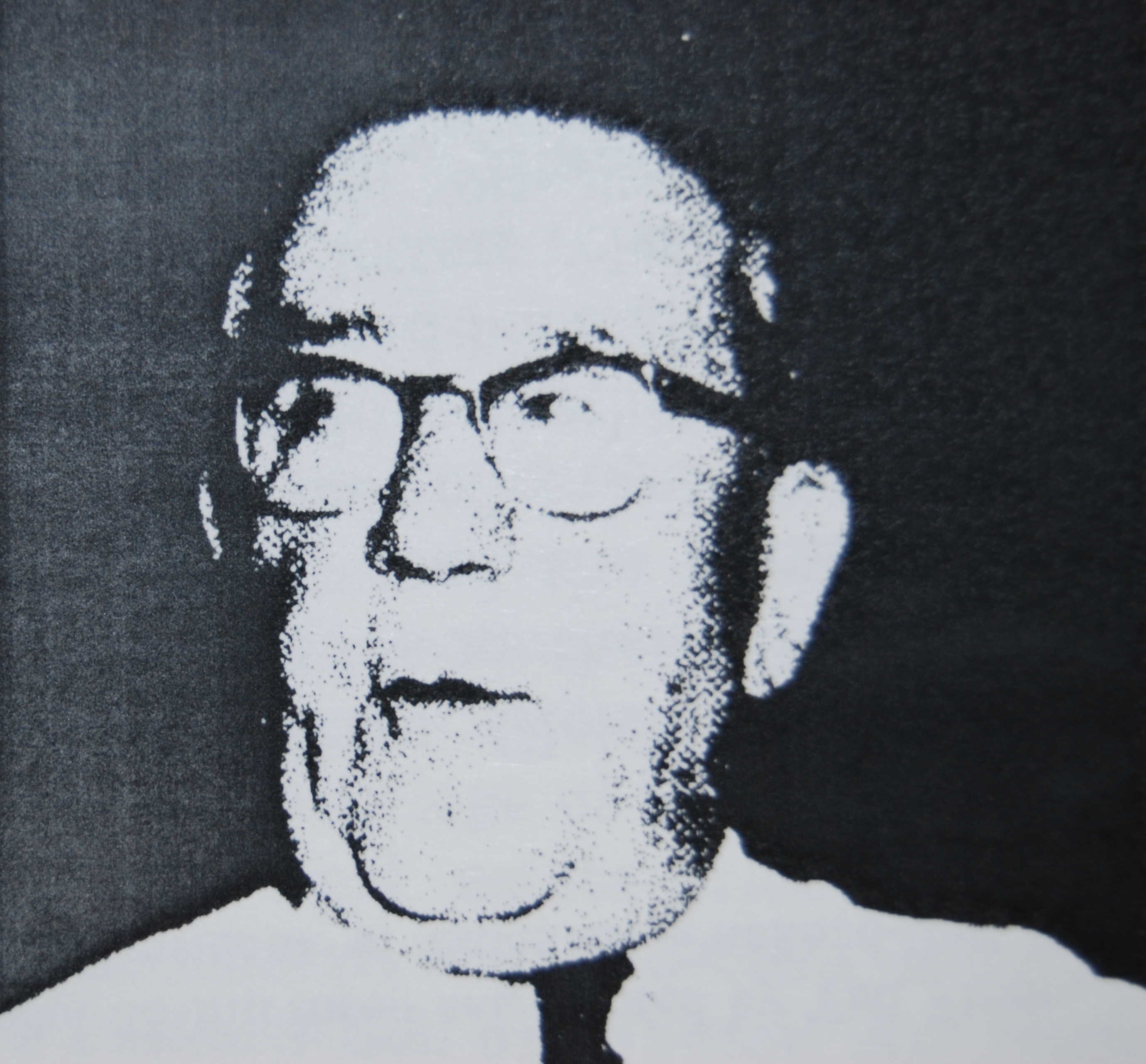
Founder Herb Bell

Herb Bell had been in radio electronics since 1926, when he had formed a partnership with an engineer named Neff. Bell wanted to expand from manufacturing in a one-car garage to a larger facility to increase production, but Neff disagreed and the partnership ended. In 1928, Bell formed a new venture with Edward Jackson called Jackson Bell Radio Company. Jackson left when Bell suggested producing higher priced radios that came with greater financial risk. Jackson Bell experienced financial difficulty during the Great Depression. The business had greater difficulty when RCA released the superheterodyne radio. Jackson Bell was licensed by RCA but struggled due to a large inventory of obsolete radios, and was liquidated. Bell then formed Packard Bell with Leon Packard, whose uncle provided the capital.

In 1934, Packard Bell marketed their first radio, the Model 35A, originally developed by Jackson Bell. Herb Bell managed to obtain the RCA license for manufacturing superheterodyne radios. Based in Los Angeles, Packard Bell, along with Hoffman Radio, became well-known regional makers of consumer electronics. Leon Packard was unhappy with the course of Packard Bell Company, and asked Herb Bell to buy his share in 1935.

Packard Bell was a family business. Bell and his four brothers Arthur, Albert, Elmer, and Willard participated in design, manufacture and marketing. The company incorporated as Packard Bell Corporation in 1946.

Packard Bell was a profitable company during World War II, producing defense electronics, and this continued into the 1960s. One of Packard Bell's products during WWII was an identification, friend or foe transponder unit (designated AN/APX-92) used by aircraft. In 1955 the company went public. Packard-Bell Electronics Corp. was adopted in 1956 as the new name for the public company. The company formed a subsidiary to produce computers in 1957, which was later acquired by the Raytheon Company in 1964.

In 1968, Packard Bell was sold to Teledyne. Teledyne was interested in expanding into consumer electronics. Teledyne converted Packard Bell common stock into Teledyne common stock at a ratio of one share of Teledyne common stock for each seven and one-half shares of Packard Bell common stock. The Packard Bell name remained but with Teledyne as a prefix (as with other Teledyne operating divisions), and was renamed "Teledyne Packard Bell". Teledyne Packard Bell ceased making home entertainment products in 1974, joining a number of manufacturers exiting the business, merging with stronger competitors or outsourcing manufacturing to foreign entities. Teledyne sold the name and assets in 1985 leading to the formation of the Packard Bell PC company.

There is minimal information regarding Leon Packard. The growth of Packard Bell was primarily from Herb and his brothers. Born Herbert Anthony Zwiebel in 1890, his parents were Anthony (Anton) Zwiebel Jr and Anna Mary Brehm. Like many descendants of immigrants, there was the desire to acquire 'American-sounding' names, so Herb changed his last name to Bell. In his leisure time, Herb Bell was an avid boater and owned several pleasure craft and yachts. He had a 98-foot (29.9 m) yacht that he later donated to the Scripps Institution of Oceanography. They were docked at Newport Harbor (Newport Beach, California) and often sailed from Newport Harbor to Catalina Island. He named his boats the Five Bells referring to him and his brothers. Bell resigned in 1962 and died in 1970.

== Radios ==
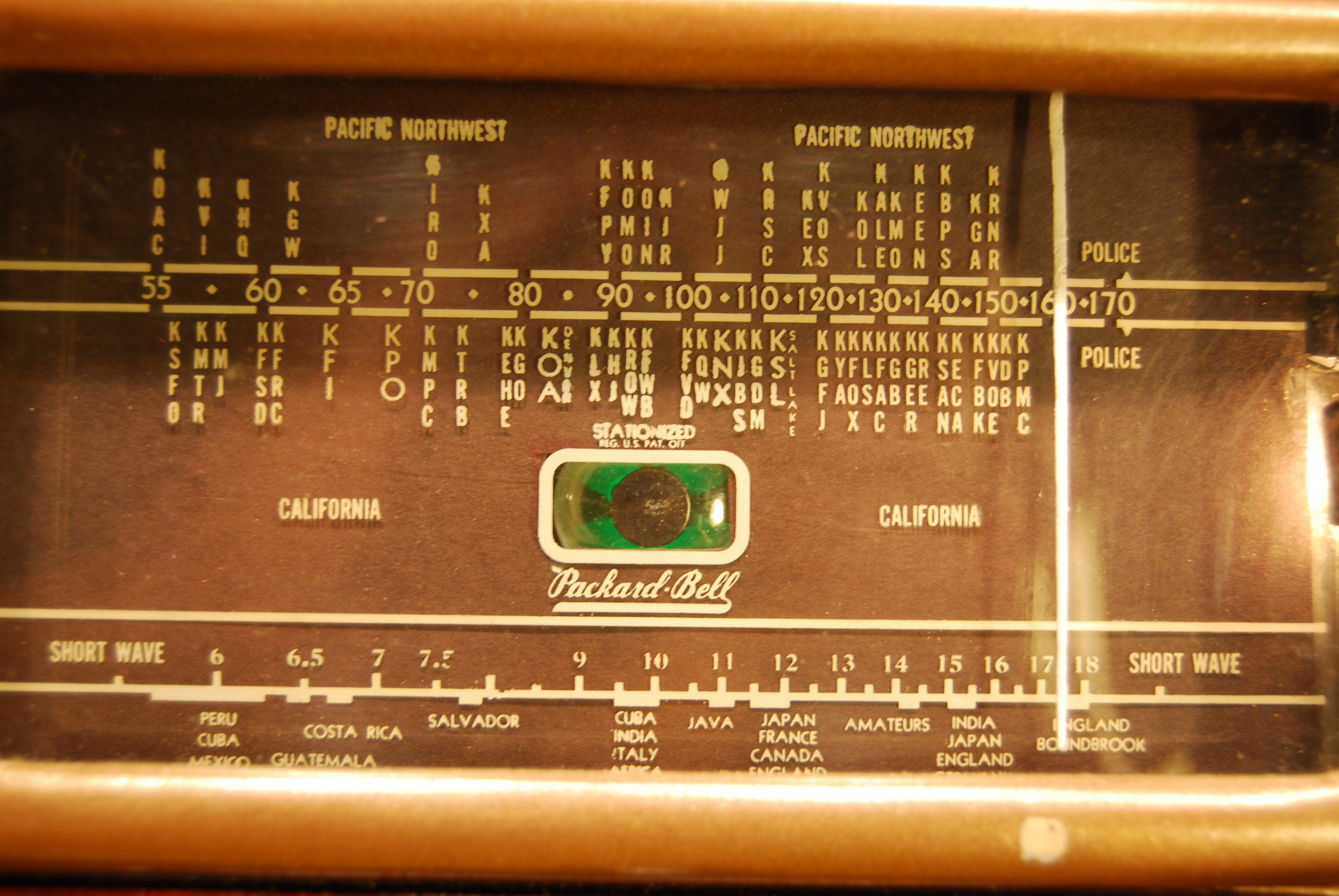
Packard Bell Co Trade Mark-Stationized Dials of US and Canadian stations west of the Rocky Mountains

Packard Bell radios had a unique styling that makes them easy to identify. Being a US West Coast radio maker, they maintained that image by "stationizing" their radio dials. Major US West Coast and Canadian (west of the Rocky Mountain range) radio station call letters were printed on the tuning dial. From 1926 through 1952, the marketing area for Packard Bell radios consisted of Arizona, California, Idaho, Nevada, Oregon and Washington. Many Packard Bell models made during this period have stationized dials with the call letters of the major stations from these states marked on the dial. These stationized dials also include KSL 1160 in Salt Lake City, KOMO 1000 in Seattle, KKMO 1360 in Tacoma, KIT in Yakima, and KOA 850 in Denver. This was an idea inspired by Herb's mother who had difficulty reading tuning dials. Sometime after 1952, Packard Bell discontinued its stationized dials when it began selling radios and televisions throughout North America.

A Packard Bell radio was used as a prop in the 1960s American television series Gilligan's Island. The Japanese made, eight-transistor AR-851 was an important plot device over the course of the three-year run of the show.

== Other business ==
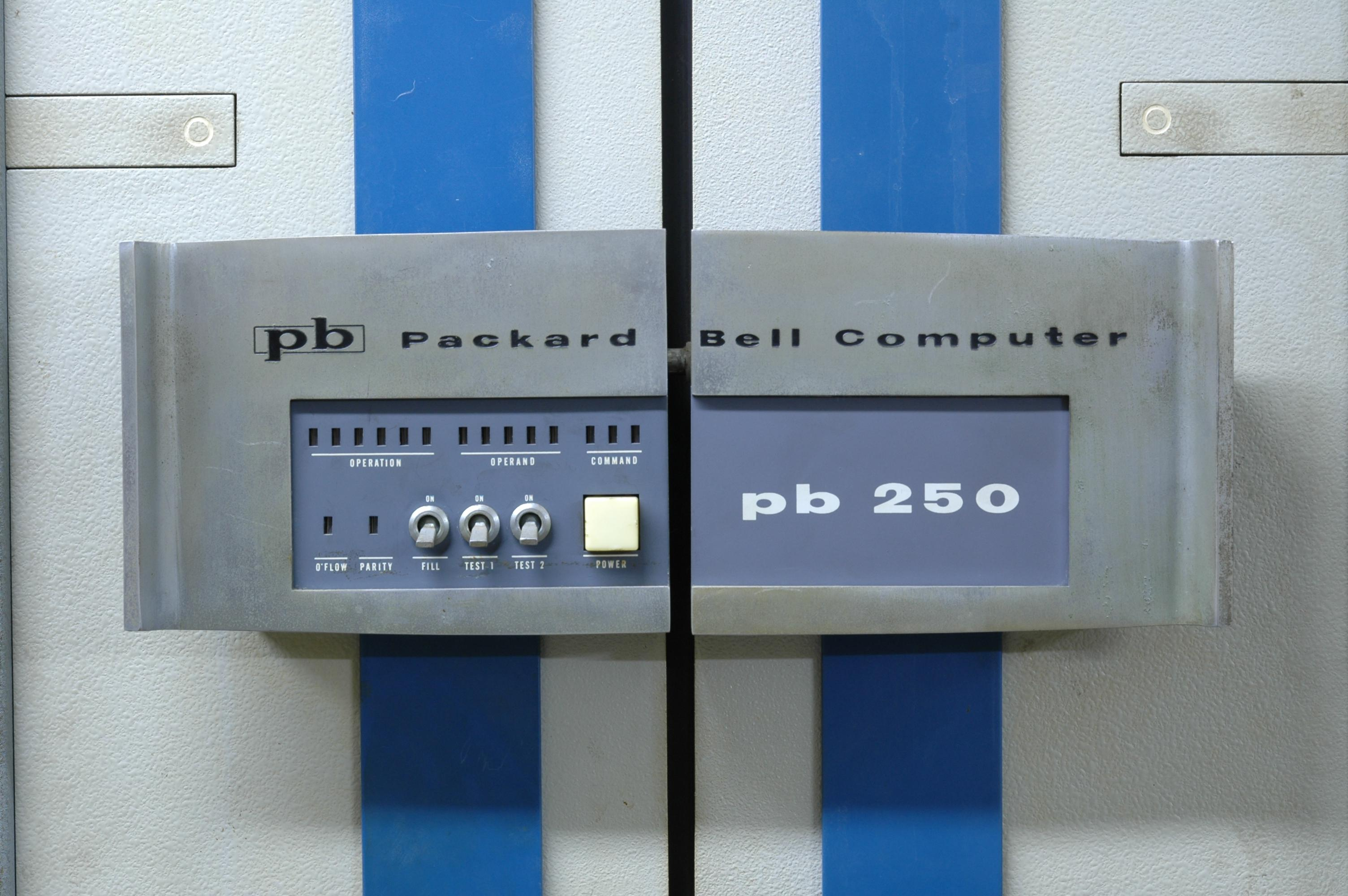
Panel of the Packard Bell Computer model PB 250

In 1957, Packard Bell Electronics formed a unit called Packard Bell Computer Corporation, which was led by Max Palevsky. This subsidiary developed and produced computers for specialized uses, such as industrial process control, military, and scientific applications. An example of a niche application was a truck-mounted digital computer that analyzed seismic data for the oil industry. Starting in the late 1950s, Packard Bell Computer was involved in the defense electronics business.

They produced the PB 250, released in 1960, which was one of the last users of magnetostrictive delay lines for its main memory. It was also the last machine to be partially based on the original designs of Alan Turing’s NPL ACE computer. The company also produced a digital differential analyzer (DDA) called Transistorized Realtime Incremental Computer Expandable (TRICE) which could optionally be combined with the PB 250. Together the two machines formed a hybrid general purpose/DDA computing system. The Hycomp 250 was a hybrid computer that combined the PB 250 with a small analog computer such as the EAI TR10 or TR48.

Palevsky left the computer division in 1961 and went on to found Scientific Data Systems. Packard Bell's computer operations were acquired by Raytheon in 1964.

== Notes and references ==
This article was split from the article Packard Bell.
