= Sigekatu Kuroda =

Japanese mathematician

- Born: 11 November 1905; Tokyo, Japan
- Died: 3 November 1972 (aged 66); Baltimore, Maryland, United States
- Education: Tokyo Imperial University (Ph.D., 1945)
- Scientific career
- Fields: Mathematics
- Workplaces: Tokyo Women's Normal School; Nagoya University (1942–1963); University of Maryland (1962–1972)
- Doctoral advisor: Teiji Takagi

Sigekatu Kuroda (黒田 成勝, Kuroda Shigekatsu; 11 November 1905 – 3 November 1972) was a Japanese mathematician who worked in number theory and mathematical logic.

In 1942 he became a professor at the newly founded Nagoya Imperial University, where he stayed for over twenty years. He was responsible for much of the effort in setting up its Department of Mathematics.

He was married to the renowned number theorist Teiji Takagi's daughter Yakeo. The couple had three sons, all of whom became mathematicians, including S.-Y. Kuroda, who was a professor of linguistics at the University of California, San Diego.

He published a text on the foundations of algebraic number theory with Tomio Kubota in 1963.
