= Eugene M. Luks =

American mathematician and computer scientist

Eugene Michael Luks (born circa 1940) is an American mathematician and computer scientist, a professor emeritus of computer and information science at the University of Oregon. He is known for his research on the graph isomorphism problem and on algorithms for computational group theory.

== Professional career ==
Luks did his undergraduate studies at the City College of New York, earning a bachelor's degree in 1960, and went on to graduate studies at the Massachusetts Institute of Technology, earning a doctorate in mathematics in 1966 under the supervision of Kenkichi Iwasawa. He taught at Tufts University from 1966 to 1968, and at Bucknell University from then until 1983, when he joined the University of Oregon faculty as chair of the computer and information science department. He retired in 2006, but was recalled in 2012–2013 to serve as interim chair.

== Awards and honors ==
In 1985, Luks won the Fulkerson Prize for his work showing that graph isomorphism could be tested in polynomial time for graphs with bounded maximum degree. In 2012 he became a fellow of the American Mathematical Society.

== Selected publications ==
- Furst, Merrick; Hopcroft, John; Luks, Eugene M. (1980), "Polynomial-time algorithms for permutation groups" (PDF), Proceedings of the 21st IEEE Symposium on Foundations of Computer Science (FOCS'80), pp. 36–41, doi:10.1109/SFCS.1980.34, hdl:1813/6282, S2CID 6943363.
- Luks, Eugene M. (1982), "Isomorphism of graphs of bounded valence can be tested in polynomial time", Journal of Computer and System Sciences, 25 (1): 42–65, doi:10.1016/0022-0000(82)90009-5, S2CID 2572728.
- Babai, László; Luks, Eugene M. (1983), "Canonical labeling of graphs", Proceedings of the 15th ACM Symposium on Theory of Computing (STOC '83), pp. 171–183, doi:10.1145/800061.808746, ISBN 0-89791-099-0, S2CID 12572142.
