= Heinrich-Wolfgang Leopoldt =

German mathematician (1927–2011)

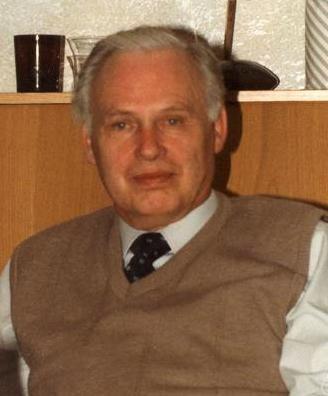
Heinrich-Wolfgang Leopoldt, Karlsruhe 1989

Heinrich-Wolfgang Leopoldt (22 August 1927 – 28 July 2011) was a German mathematician who worked on algebraic number theory.

Leopoldt earned his Ph.D. in 1954 at the University of Hamburg under Helmut Hasse with the thesis Über Einheitengruppe und Klassenzahl reeller algebraischer Zahlkörper (On group of unity and class number of real algebraic number fields). As a postdoc, he was from 1956 to 1958 at the Institute for Advanced Study. In 1959, he obtained his habilitation degree at the University of Erlangen and was then at the University of Tübingen. From 1964, he was ordentlicher Professor at the University of Karlsruhe, where he was also Director of the Mathematics Institute.

Leopoldt and Tomio Kubota introduced and investigated p-adic L-functions (now named after them). These functions are a component of Iwasawa theory and are a p-adic version of the Dirichlet L-functions. With Hans Zassenhaus he also worked on computer algebra and its applications in number theory.

Leopoldt and Peter Roquette edited the collected works of Hasse.

In 1979, Leopoldt became a member of the Heidelberger Akademie der Wissenschaften.

== See also ==
- Leopoldt's conjecture
