= Tomio Kubota =

Japanese mathematician (1930–2020)

- Born: 6 December 1930
- Died: 30 June 2020 (aged 89)
- Education: Nagoya University (Ph.D. 1958)
- Known for: p-adic L-functions
- Scientific career
- Fields: Mathematics
- Workplaces: Nagoya University (1952-93); University of Chicago (1963); Institute for Advanced Study (1963-64); Karlsruhe Institute of Technology

Tomio Kubota (久保田 富雄, Kubota Tomio) (6 December 1930 – 30 June 2020) was a Japanese mathematician working in number theory. His contributions include works on p-adic L functions and real-analytic automorphic forms.

His work on p-adic L-functions, later recognised as an aspect of Iwasawa theory, was done jointly with Leopoldt.

He extended the concept of metaplectic group, in a way significant for arithmetic applications. This opened a field for later research on associated Dirichlet series and automorphic forms, and was a major step in the solution of Kummer's conjecture.

== Works ==
- On automorphic functions and the reciprocity law in a number field. Kinokuniya, Tokyo 1969
- Notes on analytic theory of numbers. University of Chicago Press, 1963
- with Sigekatu Kuroda: 整数論 : 代数的整数論の基礎. ("Number Theory. Foundations of Algebraic Number Theory"), Asakura Shoten, Tokyo 1963
- Some arithmetical applications of an elliptic function, Journal für Reine und Angewandte Mathematik, Band 214/215, 1964/1965, 141-145
- Kubota, T.; Leopoldt, H.-W. (1964). "Eine p-adische Theorie der Zetawerte I: Einführung der p-adischen Dirichletschen L-Funktionen". Journal für die Reine und Angewandte Mathematik. 214/215: 328–339.
- Kubota, Tomio (1973). Elementary theory of Eisenstein series. Kodansha, Tokyo / Wiley, New York. ISBN 978-0470509203.
- editor: Investigations in number theory. Academic Press, 1988
