= Gustave Solomon =

American mathematician and engineer (1930–1996)

- Born: October 27, 1930; Brooklyn, New York
- Died: January 31, 1996 (aged 65); Beverly Hills, California
- Citizenship: American
- Education: Yeshiva University, Massachusetts Institute of Technology
- Known for: Reed–Solomon code
- Awards: IEEE Masaru Ibuka Award along with Irving Reed in 1995.
- Scientific career
- Doctoral advisor: Kenkichi Iwasawa

Gustave Solomon (October 27, 1930 – January 31, 1996) was an American mathematician and electrical engineer who was one of the founders of the algebraic theory of error detection and correction.

== Career ==
Solomon was born to a Jewish family in Brooklyn, the son of Philip and Mollie Solomon. He graduated from Talmudical Academy High School of Manhattan and went on to receive a bachelor's degree in mathematics from Yeshiva University in 1951 and a doctorate, also in mathematics, from the Massachusetts Institute of Technology in 1956 under direction of Kenkichi Iwasawa.

Solomon was best known for developing, along with Irving S. Reed, the algebraic error correction and detection codes named the Reed–Solomon codes. These codes protect the integrity of digital information, and they have had widespread use in modern digital storage and communications, ranging from deep space communications down to the digital audio compact disc.

Solomon was also one of the co-creators of the Mattson–Solomon polynomial and the Solomon–McEliece weight formulas. He received IEEE Masaru Ibuka Award along with Irving Reed in 1995.

In his later years, Solomon consulted at the Jet Propulsion Laboratory near Pasadena, California.

== Personal life ==
Solomon was very interested in opera and in theater, and he even wanted to get minor acting parts himself, perhaps in television commercials. Between his assignments in the Communications Research Section at JPL, he taught foreign-born engineers and scientists English by exposing them to music from American musical productions. He believed in enhancing health and the feelings of well-being through breathing exercises, and he was a practitioner of the Feldenkrais method. Solomon used the mind-body connection philosophy of the Feldenkrais method to teach voice lessons. He had a strong love for music, and was a composer as well.

Solomon was survived by one daughter.
