= Von Staudt–Clausen theorem =

Determines the fractional part of Bernoulli numbers

In number theory, the von Staudt–Clausen theorem is a result determining the fractional part of Bernoulli numbers, found independently by Karl von Staudt (1840) and Thomas Clausen (1840).

Specifically, if n is a positive integer and we add 1/p to the Bernoulli number B_{2n} for every prime p such that p − 1 divides 2n, then we obtain an integer; that is,

$B_{2n} + \sum_{(p-1)|2n} \frac1p \in \Z .$

This fact immediately allows us to characterize the denominators of the non-zero Bernoulli numbers B_{2n} as the product of all primes p such that p − 1 divides 2n; consequently, the denominators are square-free and divisible by 6.

These denominators are

6, 30, 42, 30, 66, 2730, 6, 510, 798, 330, 138, 2730, 6, 870, 14322, 510, 6, 1919190, 6, 13530, ... (sequence A002445 in the OEIS).

The sequence of integers $B_{2n} + \sum_{(p-1)|2n} \frac1p$ is

1, 1, 1, 1, 1, 1, 2, -6, 56, -528, 6193, -86579, 1425518, -27298230, ... (sequence A000146 in the OEIS).

== Proof ==
A proof of the Von Staudt–Clausen theorem follows from an explicit formula for Bernoulli numbers which is:

$$B_{2n}=\sum_{j=0}^{2n}{\frac{1}{j+1}}\sum_{m=0}^{j}{(-1)^{m}{j\choose m}m^{2n}}$$

and as a corollary:

$$B_{2n}=\sum_{j=0}^{2n}{\frac{j!}{j+1}}(-1)^jS(2n,j)$$

where S(n,j) are the Stirling numbers of the second kind.

Furthermore the following lemmas are needed:

Let p be a prime number; then

1. If p – 1 divides 2n, then

$$\sum_{m=0}^{p-1}{(-1)^m{p-1\choose m} m^{2n}}\equiv{-1}\pmod p.$$

2. If p – 1 does not divide 2n, then

$$\sum_{m=0}^{p-1}{(-1)^m{p-1\choose m} m^{2n}}\equiv0\pmod p.$$

Proof of (1) and (2): One has from Fermat's little theorem,

$$m^{p-1} \equiv 1 \pmod{p}$$

for m = 1, 2, ..., p – 1.

If p – 1 divides 2n, then one has

$$m^{2n} \equiv 1 \pmod{p}$$

for m = 1, 2, ..., p – 1. Thereafter, one has

$$\sum_{m=1}^{p-1} (-1)^m \binom{p-1}{m} m^{2n} \equiv \sum_{m=1}^{p-1} (-1)^m \binom{p-1}{m} \pmod{p},$$

from which (1) follows immediately.

If p – 1 does not divide 2n, then after Fermat's theorem one has

$$m^{2n} \equiv m^{2n-(p-1)} \pmod{p}.$$

If one lets ℘ = ⌊ 2n / (p – 1) ⌋, then after iteration one has

$$m^{2n} \equiv m^{2n-\wp(p-1)} \pmod{p}$$

for m = 1, 2, ..., p – 1 and 0 < 2n – ℘(p – 1) < p – 1.

Thereafter, one has

$$\sum_{m=0}^{p-1} (-1)^m \binom{p-1}{m} m^{2n} \equiv \sum_{m=0}^{p-1} (-1)^m \binom{p-1}{m} m^{2n-\wp(p-1)} \pmod{p}.$$

Lemma (2) now follows from the above and the fact that S(n,j) = 0 for j > n.

(3). It is easy to deduce that for a > 2 and b > 2, ab divides (ab – 1)!.

(4). Stirling numbers of the second kind are integers.

Now we are ready to prove the theorem.

If j + 1 is composite and j > 3, then from (3), j + 1 divides j!.

For j = 3,

$$\sum_{m=0}^{3} (-1)^m \binom{3}{m} m^{2n} = 3 \cdot 2^{2n} - 3^{2n} - 3 \equiv 0 \pmod{4}.$$

If j + 1 is prime, then we use (1) and (2), and if j + 1 is composite, then we use (3) and (4) to deduce

$$B_{2n} = I_n - \sum_{(p-1)|2n} \frac{1}{p},$$

where I_{n} is an integer, as desired.

== See also ==
- Kummer's congruence
