= Joan Palevsky =

Joan Palevsky (February 23, 1926 – March 21, 2006), a former wife of Max Palevsky, was an investor and philanthropist who contributed to many charitable organizations during her lifetime and after.

On October 30, 2006, it was announced that her estate had made a $200 million bequest to the California Community Foundation. There is also a classical literature imprint of the University of California Press named after her.

With Max Palevsky she had two children, Madeleine and Nicholas.

== Life ==
Joan Palevsky grew up in Los Angeles and graduated from UCLA. She earned her master's degree in French from the University of Wisconsin and then returned to UCLA, where she taught from 1949 to 1956. She was known for living in a modest two-bedroom house, driving an aging Toyota Corolla, and paying little attention to her appearance (at least her jewelry, hair, and nails), all despite her estimated $40 million settlement in her 1968 divorce from Max Palevsky.

She served as a trustee of the Los Angeles County Museum of Art from 1973 to 1979 and as vice president of the board from 1978 to 1979. After her March 2006 death, in her will her estate gave over $200 million to the California Community Foundation in 2006, one of the largest bequests ever given to a U.S. public charity. Additionally, Palevsky left $6.1 million to the University of California at Los Angeles for professorships of $1 million each to the history, French, and classics departments, and for fellowships and scholarships in the College of Letters and Science. The money will also support a campus child-care center, an honors program, a humanities center, and a research library. Palevsky graduated from the university in 1947. She also left $1.1 million to the Los Angeles County Museum of Art for its ancient-art division, its department of prints and drawing, an intern program she had previously established, the museum's library, endowment, and its Islamic-art division (to which she had given 650 objects from her own collection in 1973). She also bequeathed $1 million each to Mount St. Mary's College in Los Angeles, the National Parkinson Foundation in Miami, the United Negro College Fund in Fairfax, Va. and $2.6 million to 38 additional nonprofit organizations.
