= Automatic Computing Engine =

British early electronic serial stored-program computer

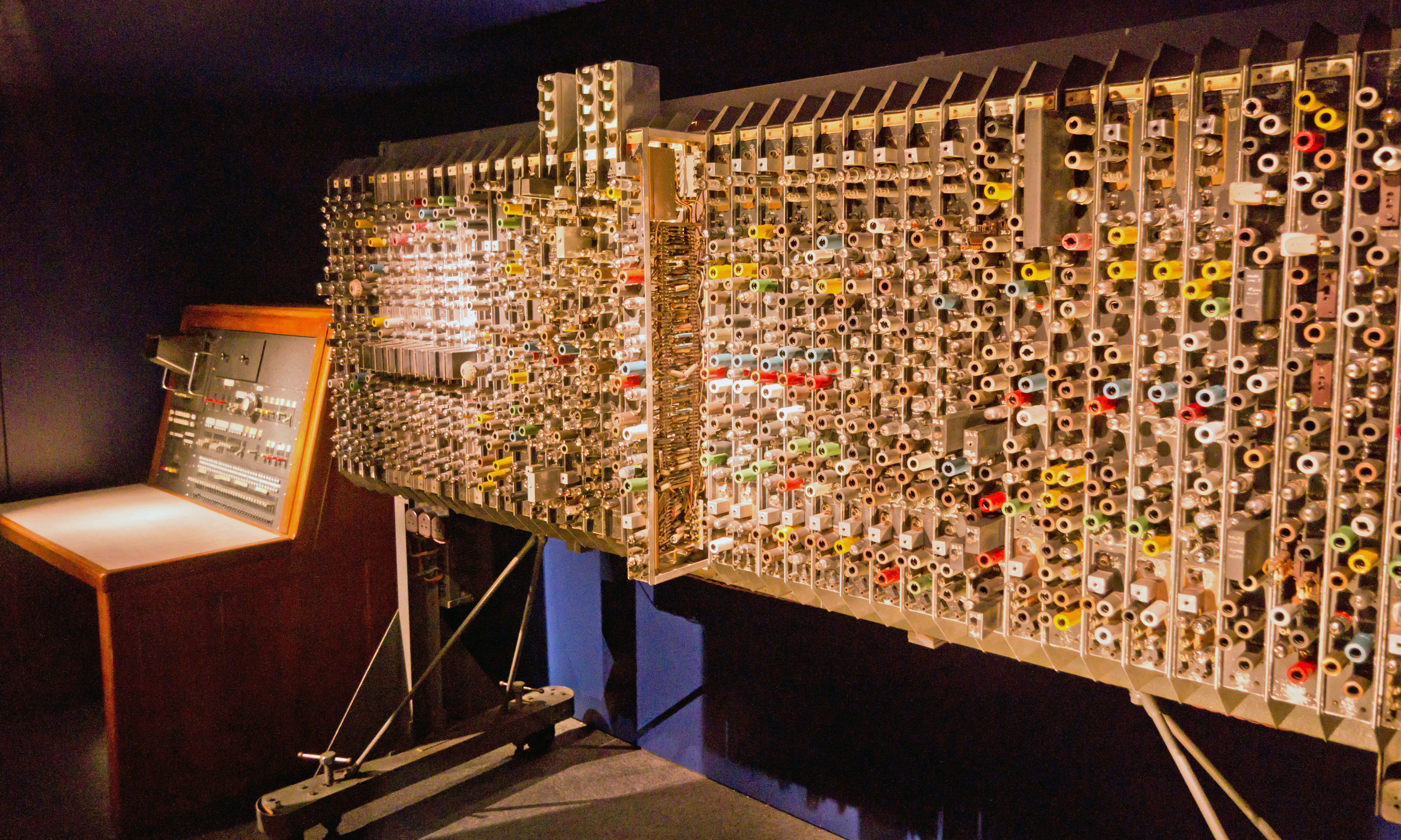
Pilot ACE

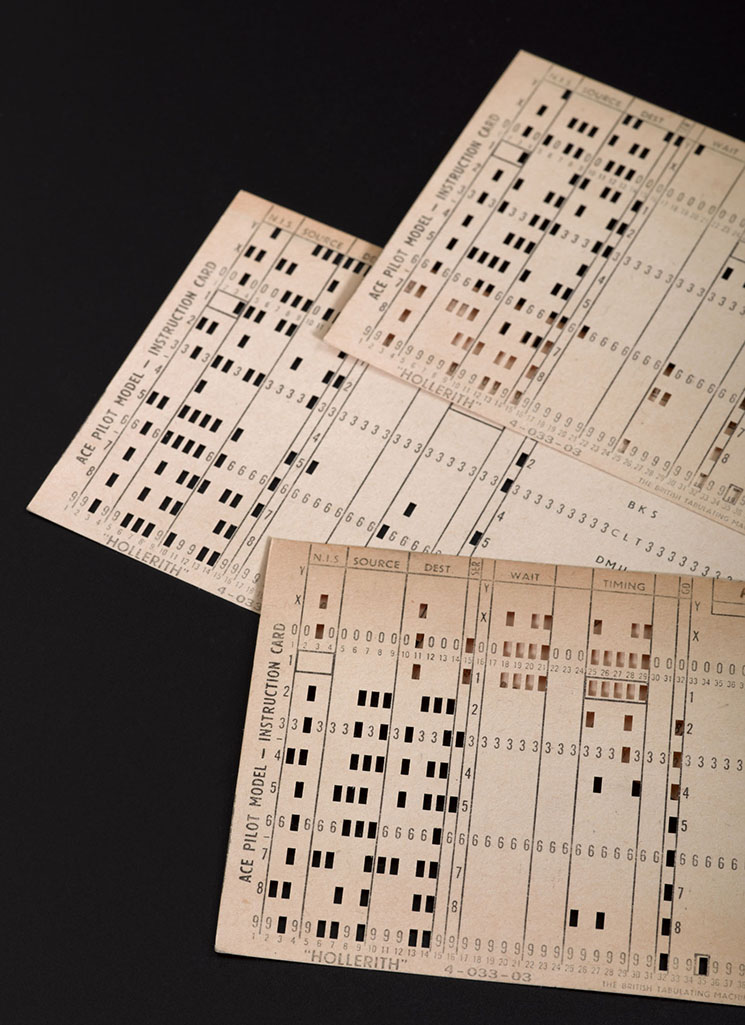
Punch cards, detail view against dark grey background, for Pilot ACE computer, built at the National Physical Laboratory (United Kingdom), c. 1950. Science Museum London

The Automatic Computing Engine (ACE) was an early British electronic serial stored-program computer design by Alan Turing. Turing completed the ambitious design in late 1945.

The ACE was not built, but a smaller version, the Pilot ACE, was constructed at the National Physical Laboratory and became operational in 1950. A larger implementation of the ACE design was the MOSAIC computer, which became operational in 1955. ACE also led to the Bendix G-15 and other computers.

== Background ==
The project was managed by John R. Womersley, superintendent of the Mathematics Division of the National Physical Laboratory (NPL). The use of the word Engine was in homage to Charles Babbage and his Difference Engine and Analytical Engine. Turing's technical design Proposed Electronic Calculator was the product of his theoretical work in 1936 "On Computable Numbers" and his wartime experience at Bletchley Park where the Colossus computers had been successful in breaking German military codes. In his 1936 paper, Turing described his idea as a "universal computing machine", but it is now known as the Universal Turing machine.

Turing was sought by Womersley to work in the NPL on the ACE project; he accepted and began work on 1 October 1945 and by the end of the year he completed his outline of his 'Proposed electronic calculator', which was the first reasonably complete design of a stored-program computer and, apart from being on a much larger scale than the final working machine, anticipated the final realisation in most important respects. However, because of the strict and long-lasting secrecy around the Bletchley Park work, he was prohibited (because of the Official Secrets Act) from explaining that he knew that his ideas could be implemented in an electronic device. The better-known EDVAC design presented in the First Draft of a Report on the EDVAC (dated 30 June 1945), by John von Neumann, who knew of Turing's theoretical work, received much publicity, despite its incomplete nature and questionable lack of attribution of the sources of some of the ideas.

Turing's report on the ACE was written in late 1945 and included detailed logical circuit diagrams and a cost estimate of £11,200. He felt that speed and size of memory were crucial and he proposed a high-speed memory of what would today be called 25 kilobytes, accessed at a speed of 1 MHz; he remarked that for the purposes required "the memory needs to be very large indeed by comparison with standards which prevail in most valve and relay work, and [so] it is necessary to look for some more economical form of storage", and that memory "appears to be the main limitation in the design of a calculator, i.e. if the storage problem can be solved all the rest is comparatively straightforward". The ACE implemented subroutine calls, whereas the EDVAC did not, and what also set the ACE apart from the EDVAC was the use of Abbreviated Computer Instructions, an early form of programming language. Initially, it was planned that Tommy Flowers, the engineer at the Post Office Research Station at Dollis Hill in north London, who had been responsible for building the Colossus computers, should build the ACE, but because of the secrecy around his wartime achievements and the pressure of post-war work, this was not possible.

== Pilot ACE ==
Turing's colleagues at the NPL, not knowing about Colossus, thought that the engineering work to build a complete ACE was too ambitious, so the first version of the ACE that was built was the Pilot Model ACE, a smaller version of Turing's original design. Turing's assistant, Jim Wilkinson, worked on the logical design of the ACE, and after Turing left for Cambridge in 1947, Wilkinson was appointed to lead the ACE group. The Pilot ACE had fewer than 1,000 thermionic valves (vacuum tubes) compared to about 18,000 in the ENIAC. It used mercury delay lines for its main memory. Each of the 12 delay lines was 5 feet (1.5 m) long and propagated 32 instructions or data words of 32 bits each. This ran its first program on 10 May 1950, at which time it was the fastest computer in the world; each of its delay lines had a throughput of 1 Mbit/s.

The first production versions of the Pilot ACE, the English Electric DEUCE, of which 33 were sold, were delivered in 1955.

== MOSAIC ==
A second implementation of the ACE design was the MOSAIC (Ministry of Supply Automatic Integrator and Computer). This was built by Allen Coombs and William Chandler of Dollis Hill who had worked with Tommy Flowers on building the ten Colossus computers. It was installed at the Radar Research and Development Establishment (RRDE) at Malvern, which later merged with the Telecommunications Research Establishment (TRE) to become the Royal Radar Establishment (RRE). It ran its first trial program in late 1952 or early 1953 and became operational in early 1955. MOSAIC contained 6,480 electronic valves and had an availability of about 75%. It occupied four rooms and was the largest of the early British computers. It was used to calculate aircraft trajectories from radar data. It continued operating until the early 1960s.

== Derivatives ==
The principles of the ACE design were used in the Bendix Corporation's G-15 computer. The engineering designer was Harry Huskey who had spent 1947 in the ACE section at the NPL. He later contributed to the hardware designs for the EDVAC. The first G-15 ran in 1954 and, as a relatively small single-user machine, some consider it to be the first personal computer.

Other derivatives of the ACE include the EMI Electronic Business Machine and the Packard Bell Corporation PB 250.

== Bibliography ==
- Carpenter, B. E.; Doran, R. W. (1977), "The other Turing machine", The Computer Journal, 20 (3): 269–279, doi:10.1093/comjnl/20.3.269, archived from the original on 3 June 2012
- Carpenter, B. E.; Doran, R. W. (1986), A. M. Turing's ACE Report of 1946 and Other Papers, Cambridge: MIT Press
- Copeland, B. J., ed. (2005), Alan Turing's Automatic Computing Engine, Oxford: Oxford University Press, ISBN 0-19-856593-3
- Copeland, Jack (2006), "Colossus and the Rise of the Modern Computer", in Copeland, B. Jack (ed.), Colossus: The Secrets of Bletchley Park's Codebreaking Computers, Oxford: Oxford University Press, pp. 108–110, ISBN 978-0-19-284055-4
- Copeland, B. Jack (2012). Alan Turing's Electronic Brain: The Struggle to Build the ACE, the World's Fastest Computer. OUP Oxford. ISBN 9780199609154.
- Lavington, Simon H. (1980), Early British Computers: The Story of Vintage Computers and The People Who Built Them, Manchester University Press
- Wilkinson, J. H. (1980), "Turing's Work at the National Physical Laboratory and the Construction of Pilot ACE, DEUCE and ACE", in Metropolis, Nicholas; Howlett, J.; Rota, G.-C. (eds.), A History of Computing in the Twentieth Century, New York: Academic Press
- Yates, David M. (1997), Turing's Legacy: A History of Computing at the National Physical Laboratory, 1945-1995, London: Science Museum
