= Kummer's congruence =

Result in number theory showing congruences involving Bernoulli numbers

In mathematics, Kummer's congruences are some congruences involving Bernoulli numbers, found by Ernst Eduard Kummer.

Kubota & Leopoldt (1964) used Kummer's congruences to define the p-adic zeta function.

== Statement ==
The simplest form of Kummer's congruence states that

$$\frac{B_h}{h}\equiv \frac{B_k}{k} \pmod p \text{ whenever } h\equiv k \pmod {p-1}$$

where p is a prime, h and k are positive even integers not divisible by p−1 and the numbers B_{h} are Bernoulli numbers.

More generally if h and k are positive even integers not divisible by p − 1, then

$$(1-p^{h-1})\frac{B_h}{h}\equiv (1-p^{k-1})\frac{B_k}{k} \pmod {p^{a+1}}$$

whenever

$$h\equiv k\pmod {\varphi(p^{a+1})}$$

where φ(p^{a+1}) is the Euler totient function, evaluated at p^{a+1} and a is a non negative integer. At a = 0, the expression takes the simpler form, as seen above. The two sides of the Kummer congruence are essentially values of the p-adic zeta function, and the Kummer congruences imply that the p-adic zeta function for negative integers is continuous, so can be extended by continuity to all p-adic integers.

== See also ==
- Von Staudt–Clausen theorem, another congruence involving Bernoulli numbers
- Bernoulli number § The Kummer theorems
