= Floyd Steele =

American physicist, engineer and computer designer

Floyd George Steele (June 28, 1918 – September 23, 1995) was an American physicist, engineer, and computer designer who grew up in Brush, Colorado. He is known for leading the design team at Northrup that developed the MADIDDA, an early digital computer.

== Early life ==
Floyd George Steele grew up in Colorado. He was named after his uncle, Floyd Odlum, a businessman known for coming out on top of the Great Depression.

Steele received his BA in physics from the University of Colorado, Boulder, a BS in electrical engineering and a MS in aeronautical engineering from Caltech. Before joining Northrop he worked for Douglas Aircraft from 1941 to 1944 and while in the Navy attended Captain Eddie's Radar School.

== MADDIDA ==
Steele was the conceptual leader of the MADDIDA design group at Northrop Corporation.

Development of the MADDIDA began in 1946 with the goal of producing the first DIgital Data Analyzer (DIDA). When the decision was made to use MAgnetic Drum memory (MAD) for the DIDA, the name was lengthened to MADDIDA (pronounced "Mad Ida").

Steele drew influence from the analog computer invented in 1927 by Vannevar Bush, which had digital components. Another influence to the MADDIDA's design was Lord Kelvin's Tide Predicting Machine, an analog computer completed in 1873. Steele hired Donald Eckdahl, Hrant (Harold) Sarkinssian, and Richard Sprague to work on the MADIDDA's germanium diode logic circuits and also to do magnetic recording.

In contrast to the ENIAC and UNIVAC I, which used electrical pulses to represent bits, the MADDIDA was the first computer to represent bits using voltage levels. It was also the first computer whose entire logic was specified in Boolean algebra. These features were an advancement from earlier digital computers which still had analog circuitry components.

Soon after the MADIDDA's completion, Steele and his team realized that a general-purpose digital computer could also be used to as a differential analyzer through the use of an appropriate simulation language.

== The Computer Research Corporation ==
A year after the first MADIDDA was demonstrated, Steele and the MADDIDA design team left Northrop, and was joined by Irving S. Reed On July 16, 1950 they formed the Computer Research Corporation (CRC) in order to develop general-purpose computers.

After developing the Cadac, an early minicomputer, CRC was sold to National Cash Register (NCR) in February 1953.
