= Teiji Takagi =

Japanese mathematician

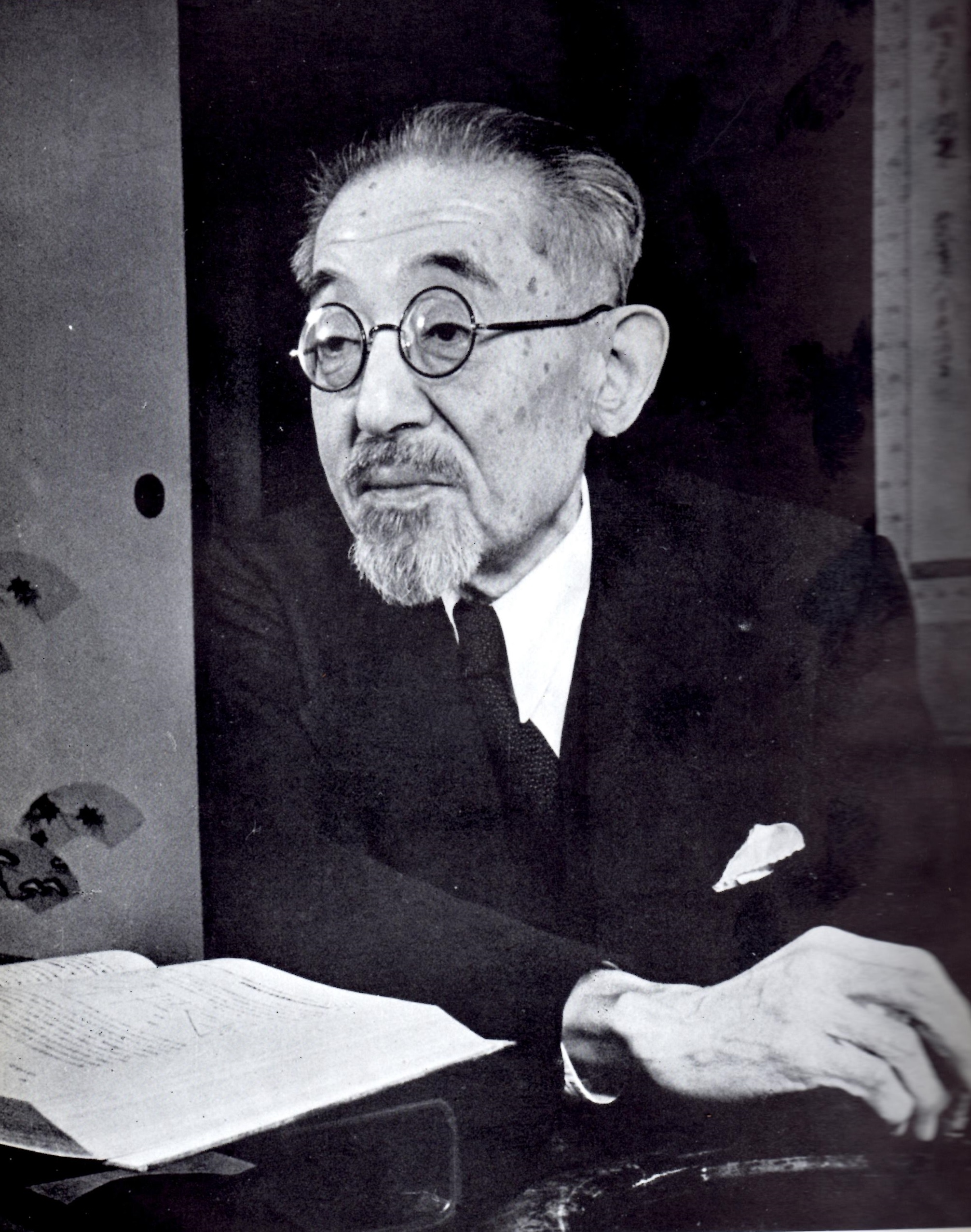
- Born: April 21, 1875; Kazuya village near Gifu
- Died: February 28, 1960 (aged 84); Tokyo
- Education: Tokyo Imperial University
- Known for: Takagi curve Takagi existence theorem Autonne–Takagi factorization
- Scientific career
- Fields: Mathematics
- Workplaces: Tokyo Imperial University
- Doctoral advisor: David Hilbert
- Doctoral students: Shokichi Iyanaga; Sigekatu Kuroda; Tadasi Nakayama; Kenjiro Shoda

Teiji Takagi (高木 貞治 Takagi Teiji, April 21, 1875 – February 28, 1960) was a Japanese mathematician, best known for proving the Takagi existence theorem in class field theory. The Blancmange curve, the graph of a nowhere-differentiable but uniformly continuous function, is also called the Takagi curve after his work on it.

== Biography ==
He was born in the rural area of the Gifu Prefecture, Japan. He began learning mathematics in middle school, reading texts in English since none were available in Japanese. After attending a high school for gifted students, he went on to the Imperial University (University of Tokyo), at that time the only university in Japan before the Imperial University System was established on June 18, 1897. There he learned mathematics from such European classic texts as Salmon's Algebra and Weber's Lehrbuch der Algebra. Aided by Hilbert, he then studied at Göttingen. Aside from his work in algebraic number theory he wrote a great number of Japanese textbooks on mathematics and geometry.

During World War I, he was isolated from European mathematicians and developed his existence theorem in class field theory, building on the work of Heinrich Weber. As an Invited Speaker, he presented a synopsis of this research in a talk Sur quelques théoremes généraux de la théorie des nombres algébriques at the International Congress of Mathematicians in Strasbourg in 1920. There he found little recognition of the value of his research, since algebraic number theory was then studied mainly in Germany and German mathematicians were excluded from the Congress. Takagi published his theory in the same year in the journal of the University of Tokyo. However, the significance of Takagi's work was first recognized by Emil Artin in 1922, and was again pointed out by Carl Ludwig Siegel, and at the same time by Helmut Hasse, who lectured in Kiel in 1923 on class field theory and presented Takagi's work in a lecture at the meeting of the DMV in 1925 in Danzig and in his Klassenkörperbericht (class field report) in the 1926 annual report of the DMV. Takagi was then internationally recognized as one of the world's leading number theorists. In 1932 he was vice-president of the International Congress of Mathematicians in Zürich and in 1936 was a member of the selection committee for the first Fields Medal.

He was also instrumental during World War II in the development of Japanese encryption systems; see Purple.

The Autonne-Takagi factorization of complex symmetric matrices is named in his honour.

== Family ==
- Sigekatu Kuroda, son-in-law, a mathematician.
- S.-Y. Kuroda, grandson (son of Sigekatu Kuroda), mathematician and Chomskyan linguist.

== Bibliography ==
- Takagi, Teiji (2014) [1990], Iyanaga, Shokichi (ed.), Collected papers, Springer Collected Works in Mathematics (2 ed.), Springer-Verlag, doi:10.1007/978-4-431-54995-6, ISBN 978-4431549949, MR 1129240
