= Magnetic Drum Digital Differential Analyzer =

Digital computer

Magnetic Drum Digital Differential Analyzer (MADDIDA)
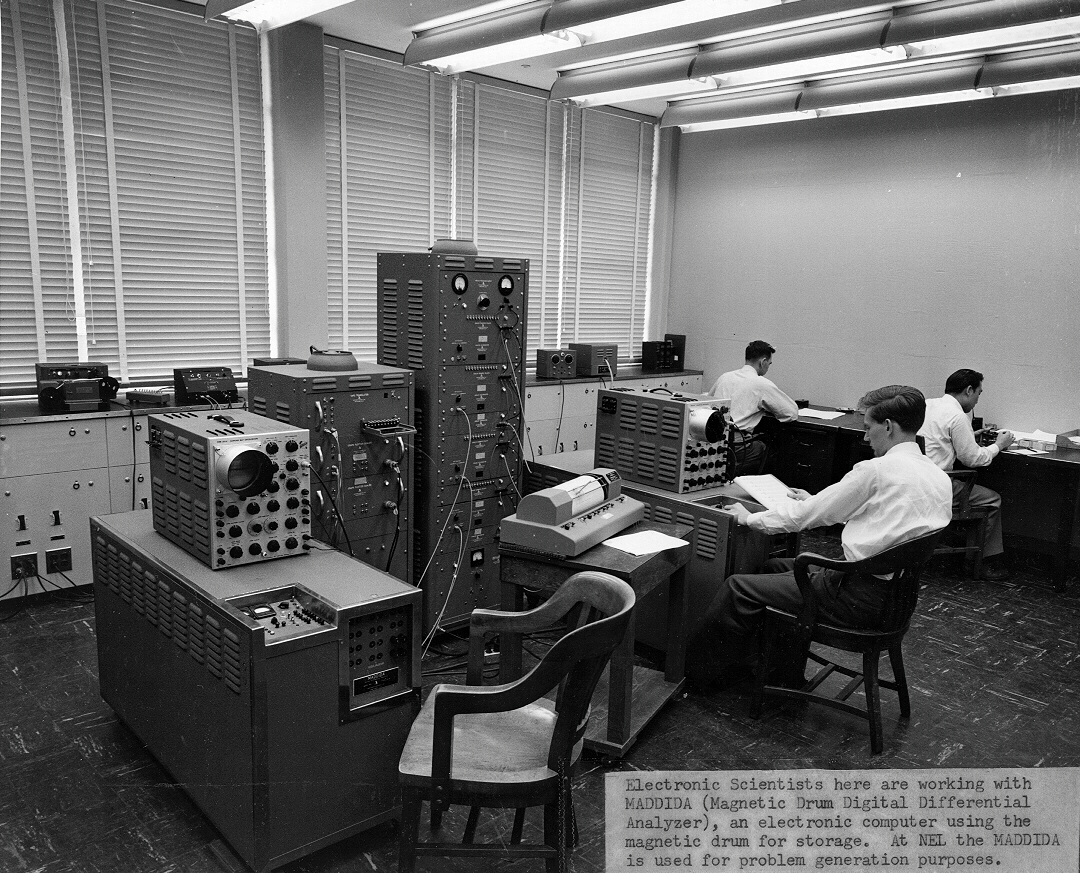
- Electronic scientists using MADDIDA at the Navy Electronics Laboratory
- Developer: Northrop Aircraft Corporation
- Released: 1949; 77 years ago
- Units sold: 6

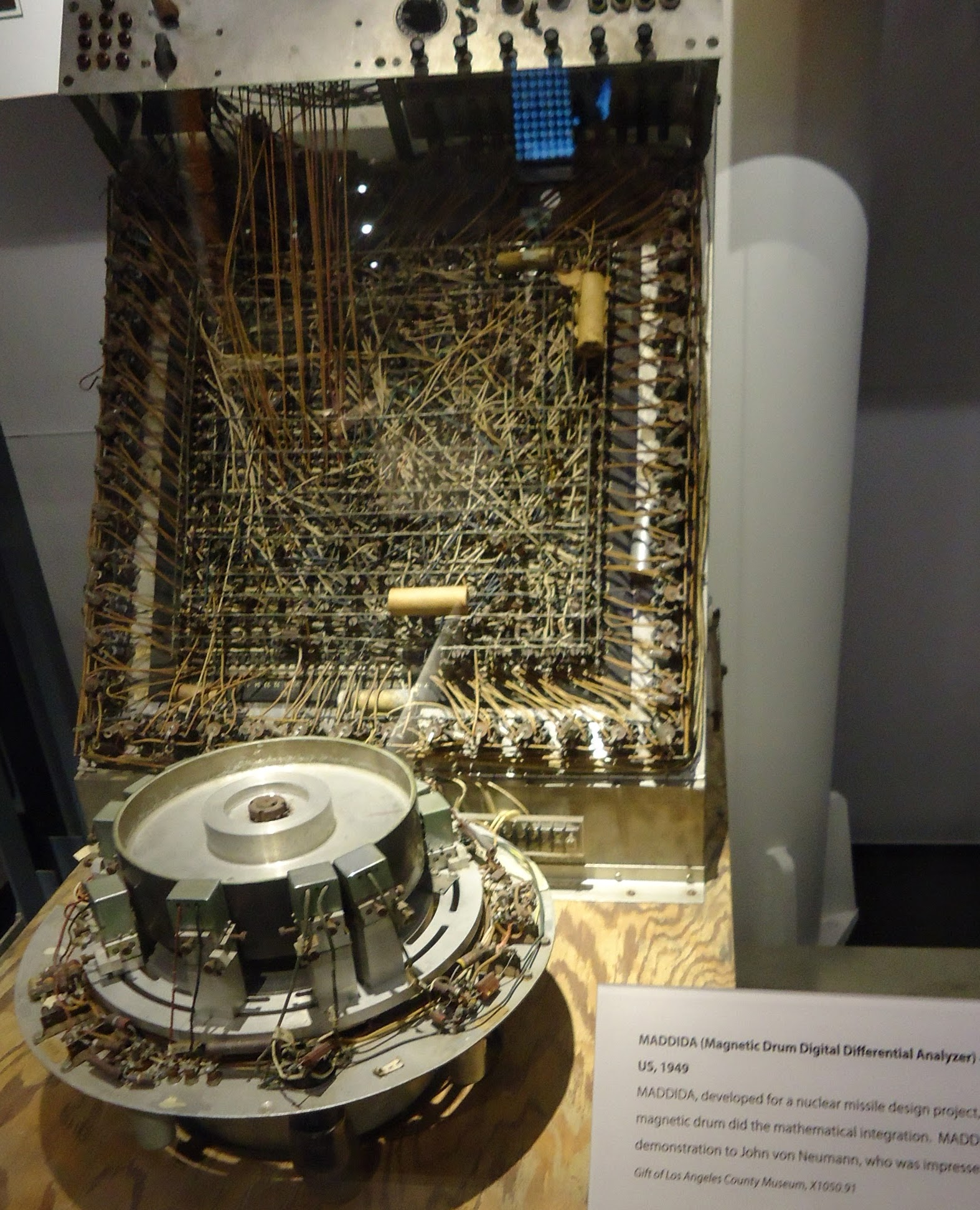
Part of MADDIDA at Computer History Museum

The MADDIDA (Magnetic Drum Digital Differential Analyzer) was a special-purpose digital computer used for solving systems of ordinary differential equations. It was the first computer to represent bits using voltage levels and whose entire logic was specified in Boolean algebra. Invented by Floyd Steele, MADDIDA was developed at Northrop Aircraft Corporation between 1946 and 1949 to be used as a guidance system for the Snark missile. No guidance system, however, resulted from the work on the MADDIDA, and rather it was used for aeronautical research. In 1952, the MADDIDA became the world's top-selling commercial digital computer (albeit a special-purpose machine), six units having been sold. (The general-purpose UNIVAC I delivered its seventh unit in 1954.)

== Development ==
Development on the project began in March 1946 at Northrop Corporation with the goal of producing a subsonic cruise missile designated "MX-775", which came to be called the Snark. Northrop's parameters for this project were to create a guidance system that would allow a missile to hit a target at a distance of up to 5,000 miles (8,000 km) with a precision that would be 200 yards (180 m) better than the German "vengeance" weapons V1 and V2. However, the MADDIDA was never used in weaponry, and Northrop ultimately used a different analog computer as the guidance system for the Snark missile.

Part of the project parameters involved developing the first digital data analyzer (DIDA).

Physicist Floyd Steele, who had reportedly in 1946 already demonstrated a working DIDA before the press in 1946 in his Los Angeles home, was hired as conceptual leader of the design group. Steele developed the concept for the DIDA, which would entail implementing an analog computer using only digital elements. When the decision was made to use magnetic drum memory (MAD) for the DIDA, the name was lengthened to MADDIDA (pronounced "Mad Ida").

In his design for MADDIDA, Steele was influenced by the analog computer invented in 1927 by Vannevar Bush, which had digital components. Another influence was Lord Kelvin's tide-predicting machine, an analog computer completed in 1873.

Steele hired Donald Eckdahl, Hrant (Harold) Sarkinssian, and Richard Sprague to work on the MADDIDA's germanium diode logic circuits and also to do magnetic recording. Together, this group developed the MADDIDA prototype between 1946 and 1949.

== Design ==
The MADDIDA had 44 integrators implemented using a magnetic drum with six storage tracks. The interconnections of the integrators were specified by writing an appropriate pattern of bits onto one of the tracks.

In contrast to the prior ENIAC and UNIVAC I computers, which used electrical pulses to represent bits, the MADDIDA was the first computer to represent bits using voltage levels. It was also the first computer whose entire logic was specified in Boolean algebra. These features were an advancement from earlier digital computers that still had analog circuitry components.

The original MADDIDA prototype is now part of the collection at the Computer History Museum in Mountain View, California.

== Distribution ==
Ultimately, the MADDIDA was never used in weaponry. Northrop ended up using a different analog computing system to guide the Snark missile, a system that was so dubious that many missiles were lost. A missile launched in 1956 went so far off course that it landed in north-eastern Brazil and was not found until 1983. Many of those connected with the program commented in jest "That the Caribbean was full of 'Snark infested waters'".

After the MADDIDA design team left Northrop in 1950, another team, which included Max Palevsky, was hired to duplicate the machine for commercial distribution. By the end of 1952, six MADDIDAs had been delivered and installed, making it the bestselling commercial digital computer in the world at the time. One of the six was sold to the Navy Electronics Laboratory (see above photo).

== Aftermath ==
While developing the MADDIDA, the design team came to realize that a digital differential analyzer could be run on a general-purpose digital computer through the use of an appropriate problem-oriented language (POL), such as Dynamo. A year after the first MADDIDA was demonstrated, Steele and the MADDIDA design team left Northrop, along with Irving S. Reed, in order to develop general-purpose computers. On July 16, 1950, they formed the Computer Research Corporation (CRC), which in 1953 was sold to NCR.

Max Palevsky, who later worked with the MADDIDA duplication team at Northrop, drew influence from the MADDIDA's design in his work in 1952–1956 building the Bendix G-15, an early personal computer, for the Bendix Corporation. In March 1957, Palevsky begin work at Packard Bell, at a new affiliate of the company he started called Packard Bell Computer Corp. Palevsky continued gaining commercial support for digital computing, allowing design advancement to continue. He retired as Director and chairman of the executive committee of Xerox in May 1972. While Xerox would eventually drop personal computing, the Xerox prototypes would influence Steve Jobs and Steve Wozniak in their 1979 tour of the Xerox facility

== See also ==
- List of vacuum-tube computers
