= Computer Research Corporation =

The Computer Research Corporation (CRC) was an early developer of minicomputers. It was founded on July 16, 1950.

The founding owners of CRC were Floyd Steele, Donald Eckdahl, Hrant (Harold) Sarkinssian, Richard E. Sprague, and Irving S. Reed. With the exception of Reed, all members of the CRC had been on the design team for the MADDIDA, a special-purpose digital computer developed from 1946 to 1949 for Northrop. Realizing that a problem-oriented language (POL) could be used to make a general-purpose computer function as a differential analyzer, the MADDIDA design team left Northrup in 1950 to focus on designing general-purpose computers, leading to them to found the CRC. After developing the Cadac, an early minicomputer, the CRC was sold to National Cash Register (NCR) in February 1953, launching NCR into the digital computing business.

Computer	Date	Units	Notes
CRC 101	1951	1	A Digital Differential Analyzer (DDA): Unlike general-purpose computers, it was a specialized machine designed specifically for solving differential equations (like Northrop's MADDIDA)
Cadac (CRC 102)	1951	1 (Prototype)	A small-scale general-purpose computer. The prototype featured roughly 195–200 tubes, while the production model (102-A) expanded to 800 tubes. It featured a 12-inch magnetic drum with 1,024 words of memory.
NCR CRC 102-A	1953	~30	Binary scientific computer with 800 vacuum tubes. NCR's entry into the electronics market after acquiring CRC.
