= Irving S. Reed =

American mathematician and engineer (1923–2012)

Irving Stoy Reed
- Born: November 12, 1923; Seattle, Washington, U.S.
- Died: September 11, 2012 (aged 88)
- Education: California Institute of Technology
- Known for: Reed–Solomon code, Reed–Muller code
- Awards: Claude E. Shannon Award (1982); IEEE Richard W. Hamming Medal (1989)
- Scientific career
- Fields: Information theory, Coding theory

Irving Stoy Reed (November 12, 1923 – September 11, 2012) was an American mathematician and engineer. He is best known for co-inventing a class of algebraic error-correcting and error-detecting codes known as Reed–Solomon codes in collaboration with Gustave Solomon. He also co-invented the Reed–Muller code.

Reed made many contributions to areas of electrical engineering including radar, signal processing, and image processing. He was part of the team that built the MADDIDA, guidance system for Northrop's Snark cruise missile – one of the first digital computers. He developed and introduced the now-standard Register Transfer Language to the computer community while at the Massachusetts Institute of Technology's Lincoln Laboratory. He was a faculty member of the Electrical Engineering-Systems Department of the University of Southern California from 1962 to 1993.

Reed was a member of the National Academy of Engineering (1979) and a Fellow of the IEEE (1973), a winner of the Claude E. Shannon Award, the IEEE Computer Society Charles Babbage Award, the IEEE Richard W. Hamming Medal (1989) and with Gustave Solomon, the 1995 IEEE Masaru Ibuka Award. In 1998 Reed received a Golden Jubilee Award for Technological Innovation from the IEEE Information Theory Society.

== Anecdotes ==
The University of Southern California graduate school of electrical engineering required doctoral students to pass an oral screening exam, in which there were eight categories of test questions. Reed always asked the questions about electromagnetism and specifically Maxwell's equations, which he obviously viewed as fundamental to communication theory.

While a student in mathematics at the California Institute of Technology, Reed did not complete his required physical education courses due to time pressure and was set to enter the Navy. The only way he could graduate was to obtain a special release from Robert A. Millikan, the university's president and a former physical education instructor as well as a Nobel Prize winner and a noted hard-liner on the physical education requirement. As Reed was in Millikan's office pleading his case, he saw reprints of two papers he had published as an undergraduate on the president's table and drew them to Millikan's attention. Millikan smiled and said "You seem to me a healthy young man. I believe you will do well in the service of your country as a graduate of the California Institute of Technology."

Reed and colleagues demonstrated the MADDIDA computer to John von Neumann at the Institute for Advanced Study in Princeton, New Jersey. The problem set for MADDIDA was computation of a mathematical function. Von Neumann, a noted lightning calculator, kept up with the computer and checked its results with a paper and pencil.

== See also ==
- Computer Research Corporation (CRC)
- Reed–Muller expansion
