= Leopoldt's conjecture =

In algebraic number theory, Leopoldt's conjecture, introduced by Heinrich-Wolfgang Leopoldt, states that the p-adic regulator of a number field does not vanish. The p-adic regulator is an analogue of the usual regulator defined using p-adic logarithms instead of the usual logarithms.

== Formulation ==
Let K be a number field and for each prime P of K above some fixed rational prime p, let U_{P} denote the local units at P and let U_{1,P} denote the subgroup of principal units in U_{P}. Set

$$U_1 = \prod_{P\,\mid\, p} U_{1,P}.$$

Then let E_{1} denote the set of global units ε that map to U_{1} via the diagonal embedding of the global units in E.

Since E_{1} is a finite-index subgroup of the global units, it is an abelian group of rank r_{1} + r_{2} – 1, where r_{1} is the number of real embeddings of K and r_{2} the number of pairs of complex embeddings. Leopoldt's conjecture states that the $\mathbb{Z}_p$-module rank of the closure of $E_1$ embedded diagonally in U_{1} is also r_{1} + r_{2} – 1.

Leopoldt's conjecture is known in the special case where K is an abelian extension of $\mathbb{Q}$ or an abelian extension of an imaginary quadratic number field: Ax reduced the abelian case to a p-adic version of Baker's theorem, which was proved shortly afterwards by Brumer. Mihăilescu has announced a proof of Leopoldt's conjecture for all CM-extensions of $\mathbb{Q}$.

Colmez expressed the residue of the p-adic Dedekind zeta function of a totally real field at s = 1 in terms of the p-adic regulator. As a consequence, Leopoldt's conjecture for those fields is equivalent to their p-adic Dedekind zeta functions having a simple pole at s = 1.
