= Lawrence C. Washington =

American mathematician

Lawrence Clinton Washington (born 1951 in Vermont) is an American mathematician at the University of Maryland who specializes in number theory.

== Biography ==
Washington studied at Johns Hopkins University, where in 1971 he received his B.A. and master's degree. In 1974 he earned his PhD at Princeton University under Kenkichi Iwasawa with thesis Class numbers and $Z_p$ extensions. He then became an assistant professor at Stanford University and from 1977 at the University of Maryland, where he became in 1981 an associate professor and in 1986 a professor. He held visiting positions at several institutions, including IHES (1980/81), Max-Planck-Institut für Mathematik (1984), the Institute for Advanced Study (1996), and MSRI (1986/87), as well as at the University of Perugia, Nankai University and the State University of Campinas. In 1979–1981 he was a Sloan Fellow.

== Recognition ==
In 2011 he was awarded a Distinguished Scholar-Teacher award from the University of Maryland.

He was named to the 2023 class of Fellows of the American Mathematical Society, "for contributions to number theory, especially cyclotomic fields, and for mentoring at all levels".

== Research ==
Washington wrote a standard work on cyclotomic fields. He also worked on p-adic L-functions. He wrote a treatise with Allan Adler on their discovery of a connection between higher-dimensional analogues of magic squares and p-adic L-functions. Washington has done important work on Iwasawa theory, Cohen-Lenstra heuristics, and elliptic curves and their applications to cryptography.

In Iwasawa theory he proved with Bruce Ferrero in 1979 a conjecture of Kenkichi Iwasawa, that the $\mu$-invariant vanishes for cyclotomic Z_{p}-extensions of abelian number fields (Theorem of Ferrero-Washington).

More recently, Washington has published on arithmetic dynamics, sums of powers of primes, and Iwasawa invariants of non-cyclotomic Z_{p} extensions

=== Selected works ===
- Introduction to Cyclotomic Fields, Graduate Texts in Mathematics, Springer, 1982, 2nd edn. 1996
- Galois Cohomology in Cornell, Silverman, Stevens (eds.): Modular forms and Fermat's Last Theorem, Springer, 1997
- Elliptic Curves: Number theory and cryptography, CRC Press, 2003, 2nd edn. 2008
- with James Kraft: An Introduction to Number Theory with Cryptography, CRC Press, 2003, 2nd edn.
- with Wade Trappe: Introduction to Cryptography and Coding Theory, Prentice-Hall, 2002, 2nd edn. 2005

== Sources ==
- Joseph Oesterlé Travaux de Ferrero et Washington sur le nombre de classes d'idéaux des corps cyclotomiques, Séminaire Bourbaki, Nr. 535, 1978/79
- Lawrence C. Washington, Curriculum Vita
