= Iwasawa algebra =

Topological structure in number theory

In mathematics, the Iwasawa algebra Λ(G) of a profinite group G is a variation of the group ring of G with p-adic coefficients that take the topology of G into account. More precisely, Λ(G) is the inverse limit of the group rings Z_{p}(G/H) as H runs through the open normal subgroups of G. Commutative Iwasawa algebras were introduced by Iwasawa (1959) in his study of Z_{p} extensions in Iwasawa theory, and non-commutative Iwasawa algebras of compact p-adic analytic groups were introduced by Lazard (1965).

== Iwasawa algebra of the p-adic integers ==
In the special case when the profinite group G is isomorphic to the additive group of the ring of p-adic integers Z_{p}, the Iwasawa algebra Λ(G) is isomorphic to the ring of the formal power series Z_{p}[[T]] in one variable over Z_{p}. The isomorphism is given by identifying 1 + T with a topological generator of G. This ring is a 2-dimensional complete Noetherian regular local ring, and in particular a unique factorization domain.

It follows from the Weierstrass preparation theorem for formal power series over a complete local ring that the prime ideals of this ring are as follows:

- Height 0: the zero ideal.
- Height 1: the ideal (p), and the ideals generated by irreducible distinguished polynomials (polynomials with leading coefficient 1 and all other coefficients divisible by p).
- Height 2: the maximal ideal (p,T).

=== Finitely generated modules ===
The rank of a finitely generated module is the number of times the module Z_{p}[[T]] occurs in it. This is well-defined and is additive for short exact sequences of finitely-generated modules. The rank of a finitely generated module is zero if and only if the module is a torsion module, which happens if and only if the support has dimension at most 1.

Many of the modules over this algebra that occur in Iwasawa theory are finitely generated torsion modules. The structure of such modules can be described as follows. A quasi-isomorphism of modules is a homomorphism whose kernel and cokernel are both finite groups, in other words modules with support either empty or the height 2 prime ideal. For any finitely generated torsion module there is a quasi-isomorphism to a finite sum of modules of the form Z_{p}[[T]]/(f^{n}) where f is a generator of a height 1 prime ideal. Moreover, the number of times any module Z_{p}[[T]]/(f) occurs in the module is well defined and independent of the composition series. The torsion module therefore has a characteristic power series, a formal power series given by the product of the power series f^{n}, that is uniquely defined up to multiplication by a unit. The ideal generated by the characteristic power series is called the characteristic ideal of the Iwasawa module. More generally, any generator of the characteristic ideal is called a characteristic power series.

The μ-invariant of a finitely-generated torsion module is the number of times the module Z_{p}[[T]]/(p) occurs in it. This invariant is additive on short exact sequences of finitely generated torsion modules (though it is not additive on short exact sequences of finitely generated modules). It vanishes if and only if the finitely generated torsion module is finitely generated as a module over the subring Z_{p}. The λ-invariant is the sum of the degrees of the distinguished polynomials that occur. In other words, if the module is pseudo-isomorphic to

$$\bigoplus_i\mathbf{Z}_p[\![T]\!]/(p^{\mu_i})\oplus\bigoplus_j\mathbf{Z}_p[\![T]\!]/(f_j^{m_j})$$

where the f_{j} are distinguished polynomials, then

$$\mu=\sum_i\mu_i$$

and

$$\lambda=\sum_jm_j\deg(f_j).$$

In terms of the characteristic power series, the μ-invariant is the minimum of the (p-adic) valuations of the coefficients and the λ-invariant is the power of T at which that minimum first occurs.

If the rank, the μ-invariant, and the λ-invariant of a finitely generated module all vanish, the module is finite (and conversely); in other words its underlying abelian group is a finite abelian p-group. These are the finitely generated modules whose support has dimension at most 0. Such modules are Artinian and have a well defined length, which is finite and additive on short exact sequences.

=== Iwasawa's theorem ===
Write ν_{n} for the element 1+γ+γ^{2}+...+γ^{p^{n}–1} where γ is a topological generator of Γ. Iwasawa (1959) showed that if X is a finitely generated torsion module over the Iwasawa algebra and X/ν_{n}X has order p^{e_{n}} then

$$e_n= \mu p^n+\lambda n+c$$

for n sufficiently large, where μ, λ, and c depend only on X and not on n. Iwasawa's original argument was ad hoc, and Serre (1958) pointed out that the Iwasawa's result could be deduced from standard results about the structure of modules over integrally closed Noetherian rings such as the Iwasawa algebra.

In particular this applies to the case when e_{n} is the largest power of p dividing the order of the ideal class group of the cyclotomic field generated by the roots of unity of order p^{n+1}. The Ferrero–Washington theorem states that μ=0 in this case.

== Higher rank and non-commutative Iwasawa algebras ==
More general Iwasawa algebras are of the form

$$\Lambda(G) := \varprojlim_H \mathbf Z_p[G/H]$$

where G is a compact p-adic Lie group. The case above corresponds to $G=\mathbf Z_p$. A classification of modules over $\Lambda(G)$ up to pseudo-isomorphism is possible in case $G=\mathbf Z_p^n.$

For non-commutative G, $\Lambda(G)$-modules are classified up to so-called pseudo-null modules.
