= Ferrero–Washington theorem =

Theorem in algebraic number theory

- Field: Algebraic number theory
- Statement: Iwasawa's μ-invariant is zero for cyclotomic p-adic extensions of abelian number fields.
- First stated by: Kenkichi Iwasawa
- First stated in: 1973
- First proof by: Bruce Ferrero; Lawrence C. Washington
- First proof in: 1979

In algebraic number theory, the Ferrero–Washington theorem states that Iwasawa's μ-invariant vanishes for cyclotomic Z_{p}-extensions of abelian algebraic number fields. It was first proved by Ferrero & Washington (1979). A different proof was given by Sinnott (1984).

== History ==
Iwasawa (1959) introduced the μ-invariant of a Z_{p}-extension and observed that it was zero in all cases he calculated. Iwasawa & Sims (1966) used a computer to check that it vanishes for the cyclotomic Z_{p}-extension of the rationals for all primes less than 4000. Iwasawa (1971) later conjectured that the μ-invariant vanishes for any Z_{p}-extension, but shortly after Iwasawa (1973) discovered examples of non-cyclotomic extensions of number fields with non-vanishing μ-invariant showing that his original conjecture was wrong. He suggested, however, that the conjecture might still hold for cyclotomic Z_{p}-extensions.

Iwasawa (1958) showed that the vanishing of the μ-invariant for cyclotomic Z_{p}-extensions of the rationals is equivalent to certain congruences between Bernoulli numbers, and Ferrero & Washington (1979) showed that the μ-invariant vanishes in these cases by proving that these congruences hold.

== Statement ==
For a number field K, denote the extension of K by p^{m}-power roots of unity by K_{m}, the union of the K_{m} as m ranges over all positive integers by $\hat K$, and the maximal unramified abelian p-extension of $\hat K$ by A^{(p)}. Let the Tate module

$$T_p(K) = \mathrm{Gal}(A^{(p)}/\hat K) \ .$$

Then T_{p}(K) is a pro-p-group and so a Z_{p}-module. Using class field theory one can describe T_{p}(K) as isomorphic to the inverse limit of the class groups C_{m} of the K_{m} under norm.

Iwasawa exhibited T_{p}(K) as a module over the completion Z_{p}[[T]] and this implies a formula for the exponent of p in the order of the class groups C_{m} of the form

$$\lambda m + \mu p^m + \kappa \ .$$

The Ferrero–Washington theorem states that μ is zero.
