= S.-Y. Kuroda =

Japanese linguist (1934–2009)

Sige-Yuki Kuroda
- Born: August 1, 1934; Tokyo, Japan
- Died: February 25, 2009 (aged 74)

Academic background
- Education: Tokyo University (BS, BA), Nagoya University (MS), Massachusetts Institute of Technology (PhD)
- Thesis: Generative grammatical studies in the Japanese language (1965)
- Doctoral advisor: Noam Chomsky

Sige-Yuki Kuroda (黒田 成幸, Kuroda Shigeyuki; August 1, 1934 – February 25, 2009), also known as S.-Y. Kuroda, was Professor Emeritus and research professor of Linguistics at the University of California, San Diego. Although a pioneer in the application of Chomskyan generative syntax to the Japanese language, he is known for the broad range of his work across the language sciences. For instance, in formal language theory, the Kuroda normal form for context-sensitive grammars bears his name.

== Early life and career ==
Kuroda was born into a prominent family of mathematicians in Japan. His grandfather, Teiji Takagi, was a student of David Hilbert. Kuroda himself received degrees in mathematics and linguistics from the University of Tokyo. In 1962, he entered MIT with the first graduating class from the new Department of Linguistics, where he wrote his seminal dissertation, Generative Studies in the Japanese Language (1965), under Chomsky's supervision.

== Important publications ==
- "Classes of languages and linear-bounded automata", Information and Control, 7(2): 207–223, June 1964.
- "Whether We Agree or Not : A Comparative Syntax of English and Japanese", in: William J. Poser (ed.) Papers from the Second International Workshop on Japanese Syntax, 103–142. Stanford, CA: CSLI Publications, 1988.
- Toward a poetic theory of narration. Essays of S.-Y. Kuroda, edited by Sylvie Patron, Table of Contents de Gruyter Mouton, Berlin 2014, ISBN 978-3-11-031838-8, ISBN 978-3-11-033486-9

== Legacy ==
In 2013, the Association for Mathematics of Language, an affiliate of the Association for Computational Linguistics, established the S.-Y. Kuroda Prize to honor "work that has spawned a broad area of research" within mathematical linguistics. The prize has been awarded at most biennially.

In 2017, the Linguistic Society of America established a fellowship in his honor. It provides funding to Japanese students to attend the Linguistic Society's biennial summer institute.
