= P-adic distribution =

In mathematics, a p-adic distribution is an analogue of ordinary distributions (i.e. generalized functions) that takes values in a ring of p-adic numbers.

== Definition ==
If X is a topological space, a distribution on X with values in an abelian group G is a finitely additive function from the compact open subsets of X to G. Equivalently, if we define the space of test functions to be the locally constant and compactly supported integer-valued functions, then a distribution is an additive map from test functions to G. This is formally similar to the usual definition of distributions, which are continuous linear maps from a space of test functions on a manifold to the real numbers.

== p-adic measures ==
A p-adic measure is a special case of a p-adic distribution, analogous to a measure on a measurable space. A p-adic distribution taking values in a normed space is called a p-adic measure if the values on compact open subsets are bounded.
