= Kenkichi Iwasawa =

Japanese mathematician

- Born: September 11, 1917; Shinshuku, Japan
- Died: October 26, 1998 (aged 81); Tokyo, Japan
- Education: University of Tokyo
- Known for: Iwasawa algebra Iwasawa decomposition Iwasawa group Iwasawa logarithm Iwasawa manifold Iwasawa theory Iwasawa–Tate theory Cartan–Iwasawa–Malcev theorem
- Awards: Fujihara Award (1979); Cole Prize (1962); Prize of the Japan Academy (1962); Asahi Prize (1959)
- Scientific career
- Fields: Mathematics
- Workplaces: Massachusetts Institute of Technology; Princeton University
- Doctoral advisor: Shokichi Iyanaga
- Doctoral students: Robert F. Coleman; Ralph Greenberg; Yasutaka Ihara; Eugene M. Luks; Gustave Solomon; Larry Washington

Kenkichi Iwasawa (岩澤 健吉 Iwasawa Kenkichi, September 11, 1917 – October 26, 1998) was a Japanese mathematician who is known for his influence on algebraic number theory.

== Biography ==
Iwasawa was born in Shinshuku-mura, a town near Kiryū, in Gunma Prefecture. He attended elementary school there, but later moved to Tokyo to attend Musashi High School.

From 1937 to 1940 Iwasawa studied as an undergraduate at the University of Tokyo, after which he entered graduate school at the same institution and became an assistant in the Department of Mathematics. In 1945 he was awarded a Doctor of Science degree. However, this same year Iwasawa became sick with pleurisy, and was unable to return to his position at the university until April 1947. From 1949 to 1955 he worked as assistant professor at the University of Tokyo.

In 1950, Iwasawa was invited to Cambridge, Massachusetts to give a lecture at the International Congress of Mathematicians on his method to study Dedekind zeta functions using integration over ideles and duality of adeles; this method was also independently obtained by John Tate and is sometimes called Iwasawa–Tate theory. Iwasawa spent the next two years at the Institute for Advanced Study in Princeton, and in Spring of 1952 was offered a job at the Massachusetts Institute of Technology, where he worked until 1967.

From 1967 until his retirement in 1986, Iwasawa served as Professor of Mathematics at Princeton. He returned to Tokyo with his wife in 1987.

Among Iwasawa's most famous students are Robert F. Coleman, Bruce Ferrero, Ralph Greenberg, Gustave Solomon, Larry Washington, and Eugene M. Luks.

== Research ==
Iwasawa is known for introducing what is now called Iwasawa theory, which developed from researches on cyclotomic fields from the later 1950s. Before that he worked on Lie groups and Lie algebras, introducing the general Iwasawa decomposition.

== List of books available in English ==
- Lectures on p-adic L-functions / by Kenkichi Iwasawa (1972)
- Local class field theory / Kenkichi Iwasawa (1986) ISBN 0-19-504030-9
- Algebraic functions / Kenkichi Iwasawa; translated by Goro Kato (1993) ISBN 0-8218-4595-0
- Iwasawa, Kenkichi (2001), Satake, Ichiro; Fujisaki, Genjiro; Kato, Kazuya; Kurihara, Masato; Nakajima, Shoichi; Coates, John (eds.), Collected papers. Vol. I, II, Berlin, New York: Springer-Verlag, ISBN 978-4-431-70314-3, MR 1851503

== See also ==
- Iwasawa group
- Anabelian geometry
- Fermat's Last Theorem
