= Ribet =

Ribet may refer to:

- Florent Ribet (born 1989), French bobsledder who competed at the 2014 Winter Olympics
- Ken Ribet (born 1948), American mathematician
- Ribet Academy, a private independent boarding school for boys and girls in Los Angeles, California

== See also ==
- Beijing Shuren Ribet Private School, Beijing, China
- Herbrand–Ribet theorem, in mathematics
- Ribet's lemma, named after Ken Ribet
- Ribet's theorem, proved by Ken Ribet
- Stade Jules Ribet, a rugby stadium in Saint-Gaudens, France
