= Gerhard Frey (mathematician) =

German mathematician (born 1944)

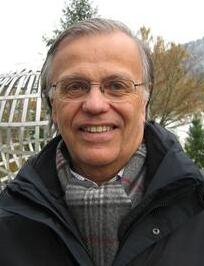
- Frey at Oberwolfach in 2004
- Born: 1 June 1944 (age 82)
- Education: University of Heidelberg
- Known for: Frey curve Trace zero cryptography
- Scientific career
- Fields: Mathematics
- Workplaces: Saarland University; University of Duisburg-Essen
- Doctoral advisor: Peter Roquette
- Doctoral students: Tanja Lange

Gerhard Frey (German: [fʁaɪ]; born 1 June 1944) is a German mathematician, known for his work in number theory. Following an original idea of Hellegouarch, he developed the notion of Frey–Hellegouarch curves, a construction of an elliptic curve from a purported solution to the Fermat equation, that is central to Wiles's proof of Fermat's Last Theorem.

== Education and career ==
He studied mathematics and physics at the University of Tübingen, graduating in 1967. He continued his postgraduate studies at Heidelberg University, where he received his PhD in 1970, and his Habilitation in 1973. He was assistant professor at Heidelberg University from 1969–1973, professor at the University of Erlangen (1973–1975) and at Saarland University (1975–1990). Until 2009, he held a chair for number theory at the Institute for Experimental Mathematics at the University of Duisburg-Essen, campus Essen.

Frey was a visiting scientist at several universities and research institutions, including the Ohio State University, Harvard University, the University of California, Berkeley, the Mathematical Sciences Research Institute (MSRI), the Institute for Advanced Studies at Hebrew University of Jerusalem, and the Instituto Nacional de Matemática Pura e Aplicada (IMPA) in Rio de Janeiro.

Frey was also the co-editor of the journal Manuscripta Mathematica.

== Research contributions ==
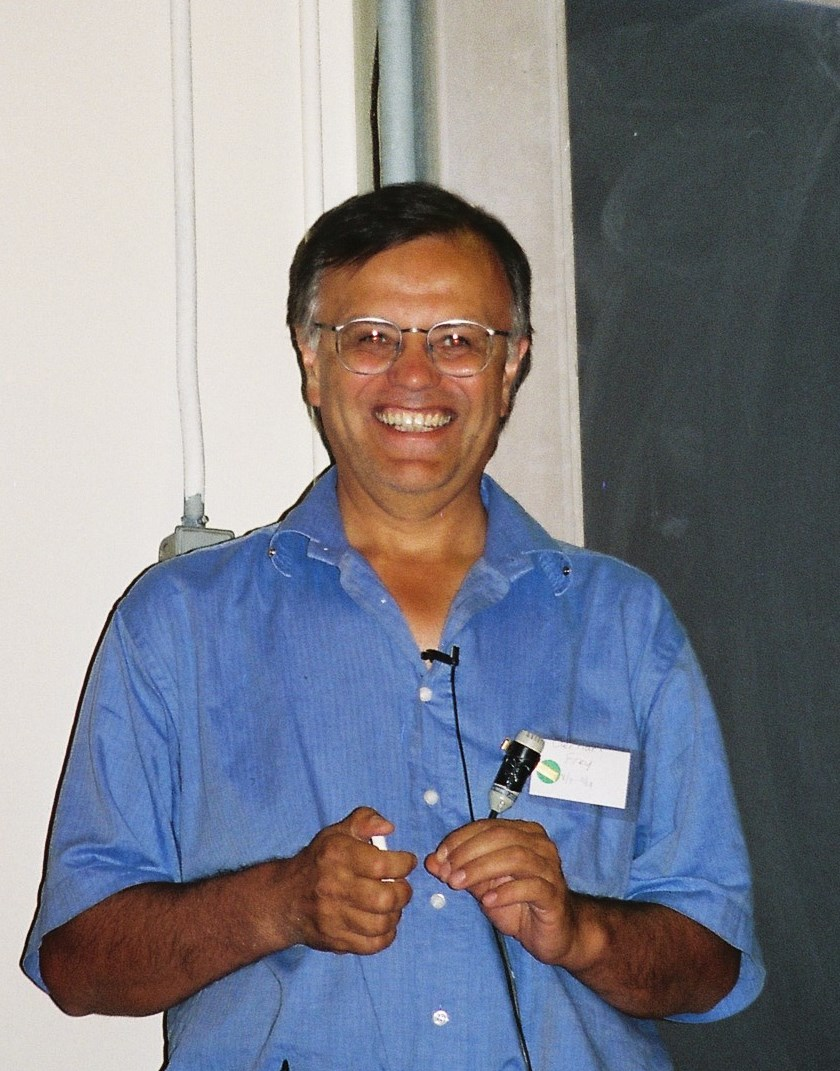
Frey at a convention in Boston, 1995

His research areas are number theory and diophantine geometry, as well as applications to coding theory and cryptography. In 1985, Frey pointed out a connection between Fermat's Last Theorem and the Taniyama-Shimura conjecture, and this connection was made precise shortly thereafter by Jean-Pierre Serre, who formulated the epsilon conjecture, and showed that the Taniyama-Shimura and epsilon conjectures together imply Fermat. Soon after, Ken Ribet proved enough of the epsilon conjecture to deduce that Taniyama-Shimura implied Fermat's Last Theorem. This approach provided a framework for the subsequent successful attack on Fermat's Last Theorem by Andrew Wiles in the 1990s.

In 1998, Frey proposed the idea of Weil descent attack for elliptic curves over finite fields with composite degree. As a result of this attack, cryptographers lost their interest in these curves.

== Awards and honors ==
Frey was awarded the Gauss medal of the Braunschweigische Wissenschaftliche Gesellschaft in 1996 for his work on Fermat's Last Theorem. Since 1998, he has been a member of the Göttingen Academy of Sciences.

In 2006, he received the Certicom ECC Visionary Award for his contributions to elliptic-curve cryptography.

== See also ==
- Elliptic curves
- Fermat's Last Theorem
- Hyperelliptic curve cryptography
- Tate pairing
