= SRPS =

SPRS may refer to

- Shorncliffe Redoubt Preservation Society
- Scottish Railway Preservation Society who operate the Bo'ness & Kinneil Railway and SRPS Railtours
- Beijing Shuren Ribet Private School
