= Frey curve =

Elliptic curve associated with a Fermat triple

In mathematics, a Frey curve or Frey–Hellegouarch curve is the elliptic curve
$$y^2 = x(x - \alpha)(x + \beta)$$
associated with an ABC triple $\alpha+\beta=\gamma$. This relates properties of solutions of equations to elliptic curves. This curve was popularized in its application to Fermat’s Last Theorem where one investigates a (hypothetical) solution of Fermat's equation

$$a^\ell + b^\ell = c^\ell.$$

The curve is named after Gerhard Frey and (sometimes) Yves Hellegouarch.

== History ==
Yves Hellegouarch (1975) came up with the idea of associating solutions $(a,b,c)$ of Fermat's equation with a completely different mathematical object: an elliptic curve. If ℓ is an odd prime and a, b, and c are positive integers such that
$$a^\ell + b^\ell = c^\ell,$$
then a corresponding Frey curve is an algebraic curve given by the equation
$$y^2 = x(x - a^\ell)(x + b^\ell),$$
or, equivalently
$$y^2 = x(x - a^\ell)(x - c^\ell).$$
This is a nonsingular algebraic curve of genus one defined over Q, and its projective completion is an elliptic curve over Q.

Gerhard Frey (1982) called attention to the unusual properties of the same curve as Hellegouarch, which became called a Frey curve. This provided a bridge between Fermat and Taniyama by showing that a counterexample to Fermat's Last Theorem would create such a curve that would not be modular. The conjecture attracted considerable interest when Frey (1986) suggested that the Taniyama–Shimura–Weil conjecture implies Fermat's Last Theorem. However, his argument was not complete. In 1985, Jean-Pierre Serre proposed that a Frey curve could not be modular and provided a partial proof of this. This showed that a proof of the semistable case of the Taniyama–Shimura conjecture would imply Fermat's Last Theorem. Serre did not provide a complete proof and what was missing became known as the epsilon conjecture or ε-conjecture. In the summer of 1986, Ribet (1990) proved the epsilon conjecture, thereby proving that the Taniyama–Shimura–Weil conjecture implies Fermat's Last Theorem.
