= Ribet's lemma =

In mathematics, Ribet's lemma gives conditions for a subgroup of a product of groups to be the whole product group. It was introduced by Ribet (1976, lemma 5.2.2).

== Statement ==
Suppose G_{1}×...×G_{n} is a product of perfect groups. Then any normal subgroup of this product that maps onto all the factors G_{i} for i=1, ..., n is the whole product group.
