= Herbrand–Ribet theorem =

Result on the class group of certain number fields, strengthening Ernst Kummer's theorem

In mathematics, the Herbrand–Ribet theorem is a result on the class group of certain number fields. It is a strengthening of Ernst Kummer's theorem to the effect that the prime p divides the class number of the cyclotomic field of p-th roots of unity if and only if p divides the numerator of the n-th Bernoulli number B_{n} for some n, 0 < n < p − 1. The Herbrand–Ribet theorem specifies what, in particular, it means when p divides such an B_{n}.

== Statement ==
The Galois group Δ of the cyclotomic field of pth roots of unity for an odd prime p, Q(ζ) with ζ^{p} = 1, consists of the p − 1 group elements σ_{a}, where $\sigma_a(\zeta) = \zeta^a$. As a consequence of Fermat's little theorem, in the ring of p-adic integers $\mathbb{Z}_p$ we have p − 1 roots of unity, each of which is congruent mod p to some number in the range 1 to p − 1; we can therefore define a Dirichlet character ω (the Teichmüller character) with values in $\mathbb{Z}_p$ by requiring that for n relatively prime to p, ω(n) be congruent to n modulo p. The p part of the class group is a $\mathbb{Z}_p$-module (since it is p-primary), hence a module over the group ring $\mathbb{Z}_p[\Delta]$. We now define idempotent elements of the group ring for each n from 1 to p − 1, as

$$\epsilon_n = \frac{1}{p-1}\sum_{a=1}^{p-1} \omega(a)^n \sigma_a^{-1}.$$

It is easy to see that $\sum\epsilon_n = 1$ and $\epsilon_i\epsilon_j = \delta_{ij}\epsilon_i$ where $\delta_{ij}$ is the Kronecker delta. This allows us to break up the p part of the ideal class group G of Q(ζ) by means of the idempotents; if G is the p-primary part of the ideal class group, then, letting G_{n} = ε_{n}(G), we have $G = \oplus G_n$.

The Herbrand–Ribet theorem states that for odd n, G_{n} is nontrivial if and only if p divides the Bernoulli number B_{p−n}.

The theorem makes no assertion about even values of n, but there is no known p for which G_{n} is nontrivial for any even n: triviality for all p would be a consequence of Vandiver's conjecture.

== Proofs ==
The part saying p divides B_{p−n} if G_{n} is not trivial is due to Jacques Herbrand. The converse, that if p divides B_{p−n} then G_{n} is not trivial is due to Kenneth Ribet, and is considerably more difficult. By class field theory, this can only be true if there is an unramified extension of the field of pth roots of unity by a cyclic extension of degree p which behaves in the specified way under the action of Σ; Ribet proves this by actually constructing such an extension using methods in the theory of modular forms. A more elementary proof of Ribet's converse to Herbrand's theorem, a consequence of the theory of Euler systems, can be found in Washington's book on cyclotomic fields.

== Generalizations ==
Ribet's methods were developed further by Barry Mazur and Andrew Wiles in order to prove the main conjecture of Iwasawa theory, a corollary of which is a strengthening of the Herbrand–Ribet theorem: the power of p dividing B_{p−n} is exactly the power of p dividing the order of G_{n}.

== See also ==
- Iwasawa theory
- Stickelberger's theorem
- Kummer–Vandiver conjecture
- Ankeny–Artin–Chowla congruence, similar for class numbers of real quadratic fields
- Bernoulli number § The Kummer theorems
