= Songzhuang, Beijing =

Songzhuang Town 宋庄镇
- Town
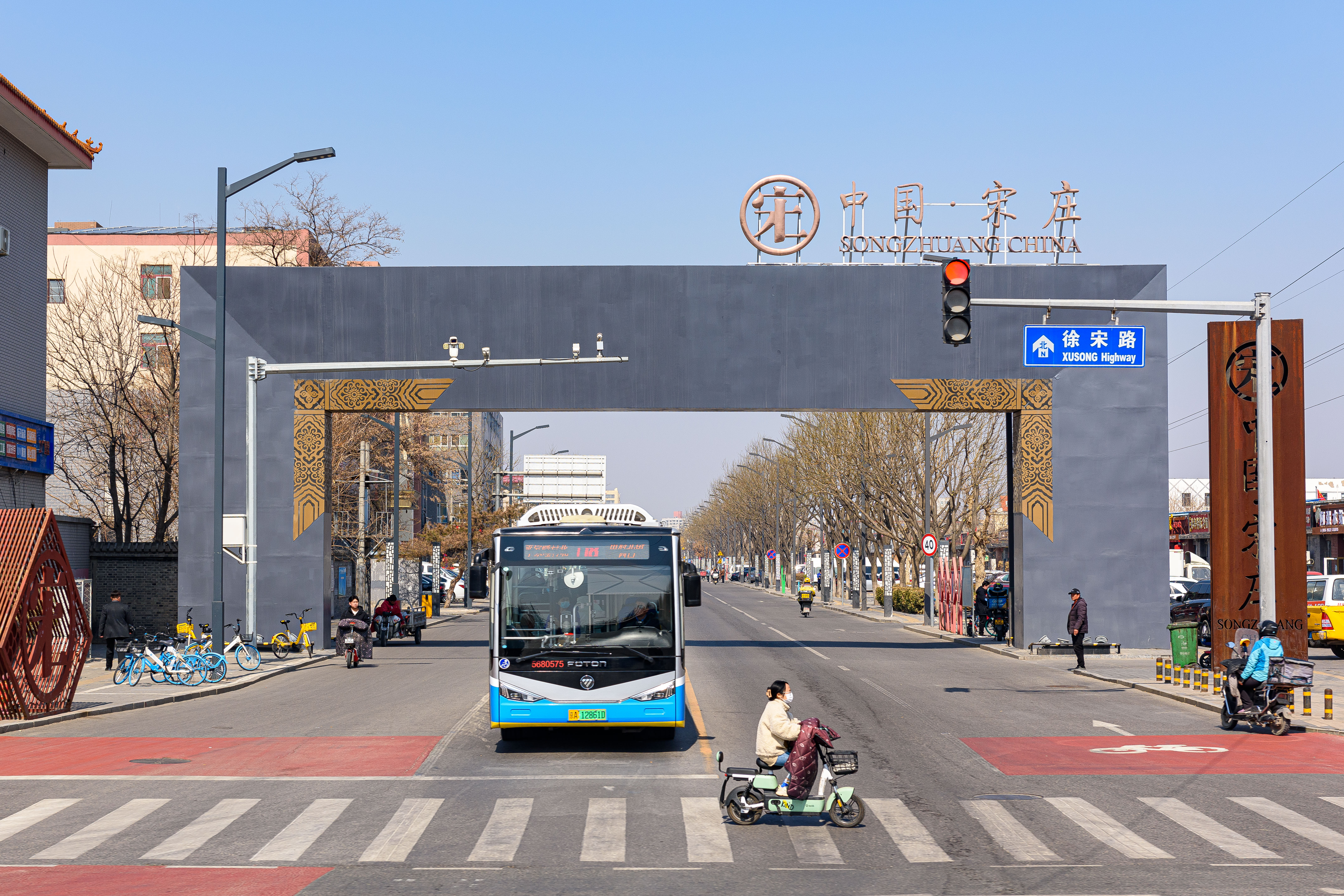
- Southern section of Xiaopu Village, 2024

- Location within Beijing Location within China
- Coordinates: 39°56′22″N 116°43′17″E
- Country: China
- Municipality: Beijing
- District: Tongzhou
- Village-level Divisions: 47 villages

Area
  - Total: 114 km^{2} (44 sq mi)
- Elevation: 23 m (75 ft)

Population (2020)
  - Total: 145,247
  - Density: 1,270/km^{2} (3,300/sq mi)
- Time zone: UTC+8 (China Standard)
- Postal code: 101118
- Area code: 010

Songzhuang Town (Chinese: 宋庄镇; pinyin: Sòngzhuāng Zhèn) is a town in the northern portion of Tongzhou District in the eastern suburbs of Beijing. It shares border with Liqiao Town in its north, Chaobai River in its east, Lucheng Town in its southeast, Luyi Subdistrict and Yongshun Town in its southwest, and Jinzhan Town in its west. In 2020, the population of Songzhuang Town was 145,247.

The name Songzhuang (Chinese: 宋庄; lit. 'Song's Village') came from the fact that this region was mostly settled by members of Song family during its foundation in the Yuan dynasty.

== History ==
Timeline of Songzhuang Town's History
Year	Status	Belonged to
1948 – 1950	1st District (Southern section)	(Northern section) Shunyi County; (Southern section) Tong County
1950 – 1956	1st District	Tong County
1956 – 1958	Dili Township; Xindian Township; Xinggezhuang Township	Tong County
1958 – 1960	Songzhuang People's Commune	Tong County
1960 – 1965	Beisizhuang People's Commune; Gaoxinzhuang People's Commune	Tong County
1965 – 1983	Songzhuang People's Commune	Tong County
1983 – 1990	Songzhuang Township	Tong County
1990 – 1997	Songzhuang Town	Tong County
1997 – 2001	Songzhuang Town	Tongzhou District
2001–present	Songzhuang Town; (Incorporated Xuxinzhuang Town)	Tongzhou District

== Administration divisions ==
In the year 2021, Songzhuang Town comprised 47 villages:

Administrative division code	Subdivision names	Name transliteration
110112104201	宋庄	Songzhuang
110112104202	高各庄	Gaogezhuang
110112104203	翟里	Dili
110112104204	北寺庄	Beisizhuang
110112104205	小杨各庄	Xiao Yanggezhuang
110112104206	白庙	Baimiao
110112104207	任庄	Renzhuang
110112104208	辛店	Xindian
110112104209	喇嘛庄	Lamazhuang
110112104210	大兴庄	Daixingzhuang
110112104211	小堡	Xiaopu
110112104212	疃里	Tuanli
110112104213	六合	Liuhe
110112104214	后夏公庄	Hou Xiagongzhuang
110112104215	前夏公庄	Qian Xiagongzhuang
110112104216	邢各庄	Xinggezhuang
110112104217	丁各庄	Dinggezhuang
110112104218	高辛庄	Gaoxinzhuang
110112104219	菜园	Caiyuan
110112104220	小邓各庄	Xiao Denggezhuang
110112104221	大邓各庄	Da Denggezhuang
110112104222	师姑庄	Shiguzhuang
110112104223	北刘各庄	Bei Liugezhuang
110112104224	摇不动	Yaobudong
110112104225	关辛庄	Guanxinzhuang
110112104226	西赵	Xizhao
110112104227	港北	Gangbei
110112104228	南马庄	Nanmazhuang
110112104229	郝各庄	Hegezhuang
110112104230	徐辛庄	Xuxinzhuang
110112104231	管头	Guantou
110112104232	吴各庄	Wugezhuang
110112104233	葛渠	Gequ
110112104234	寨辛庄	Hanxinzhuang
110112104235	寨里	Hanli
110112104236	北窑上	Beiyaoshang
110112104237	王辛庄	Wangxinzhuang
110112104238	岗子	Gangzi
110112104239	内军庄	Neijunzhuang
110112104240	平家疃	Pungjiatuan
110112104241	小营	Xiaoying
110112104242	草寺	Caosi
110112104243	尹各庄	Yingezhuang
110112104244	富豪	Fuhao
110112104245	大庞村	Dapangzhuang
110112104246	双埠头	Shuangbutou
110112104247	沟渠庄	Gouquzhuang

== Gallery ==
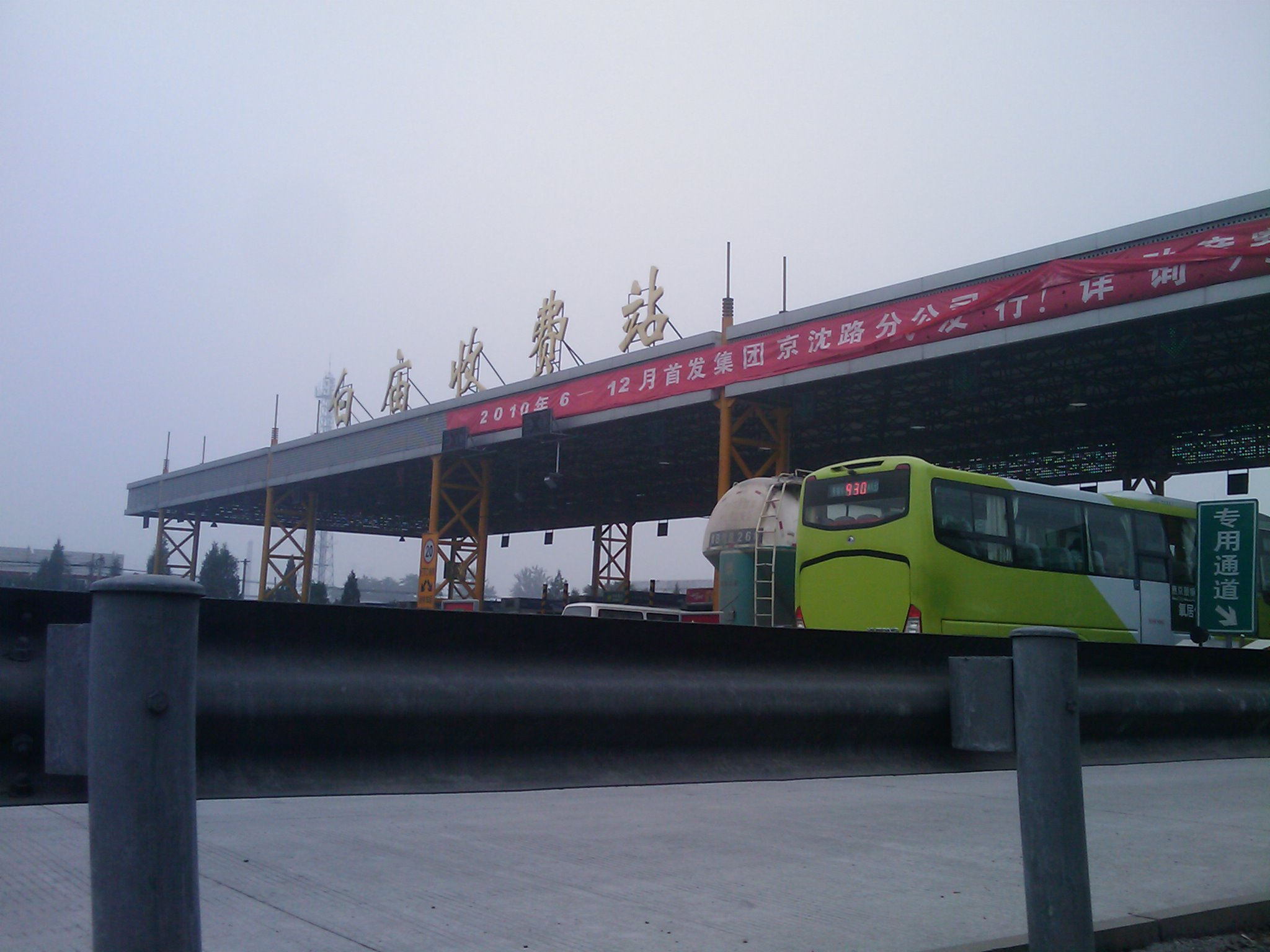
Baimiao Toll Station on G1 Expressway, 2010

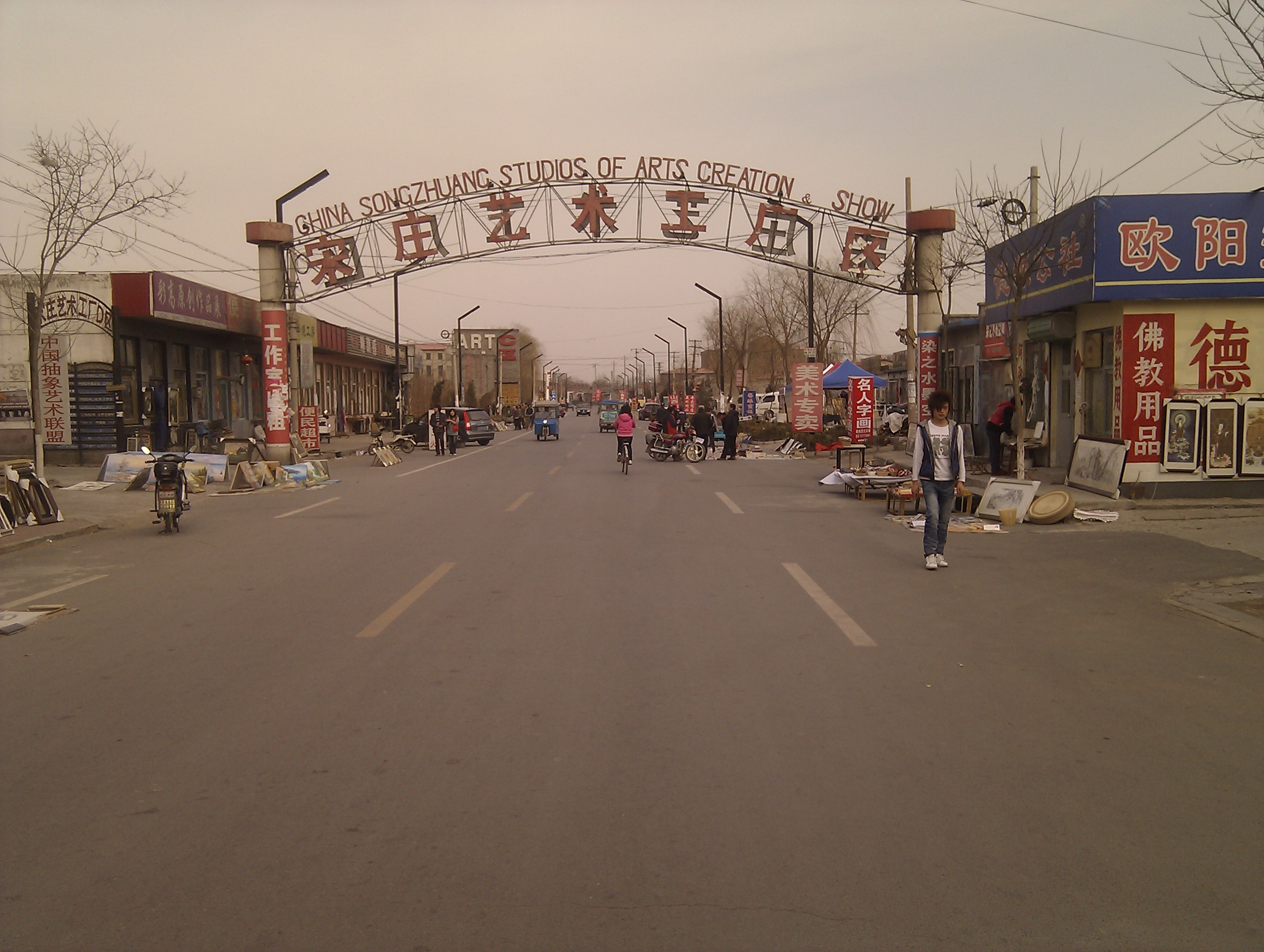
Gate of Songzhuang Art Town, 2011

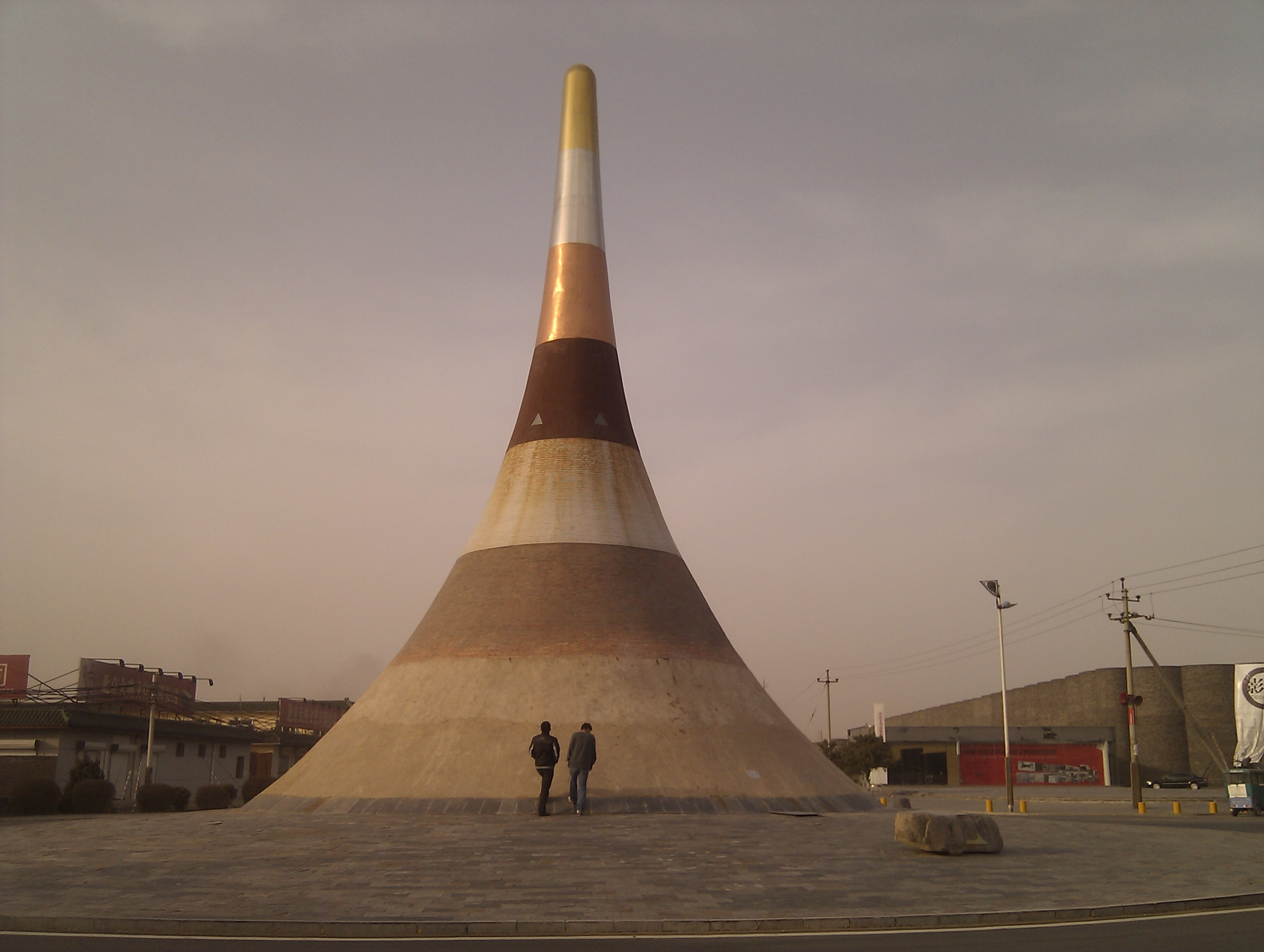
Tower on the center of Xiaopu Roundabout, 2011

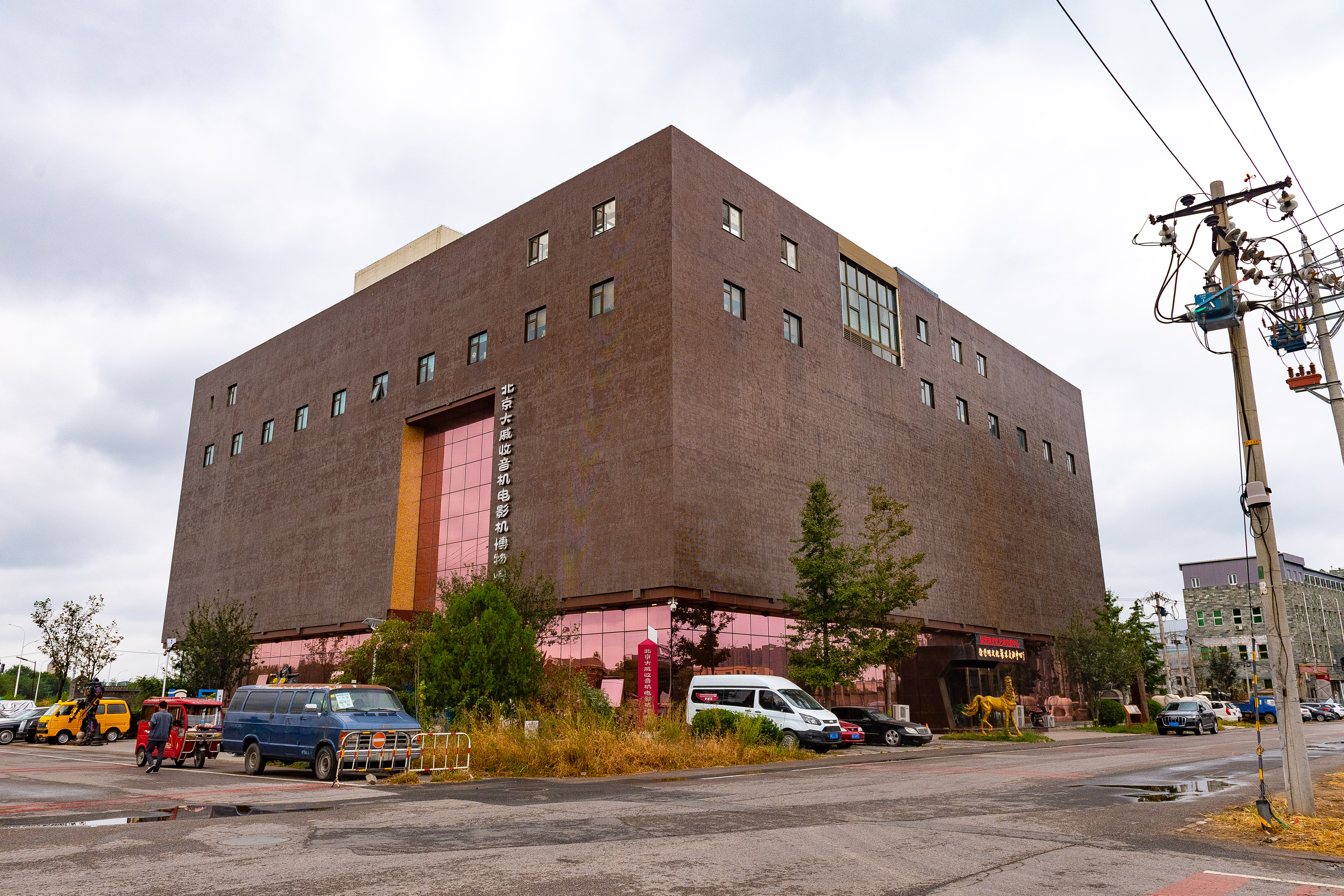
Beijing Daqi Museum for Radios and Movie Projectors, 2022

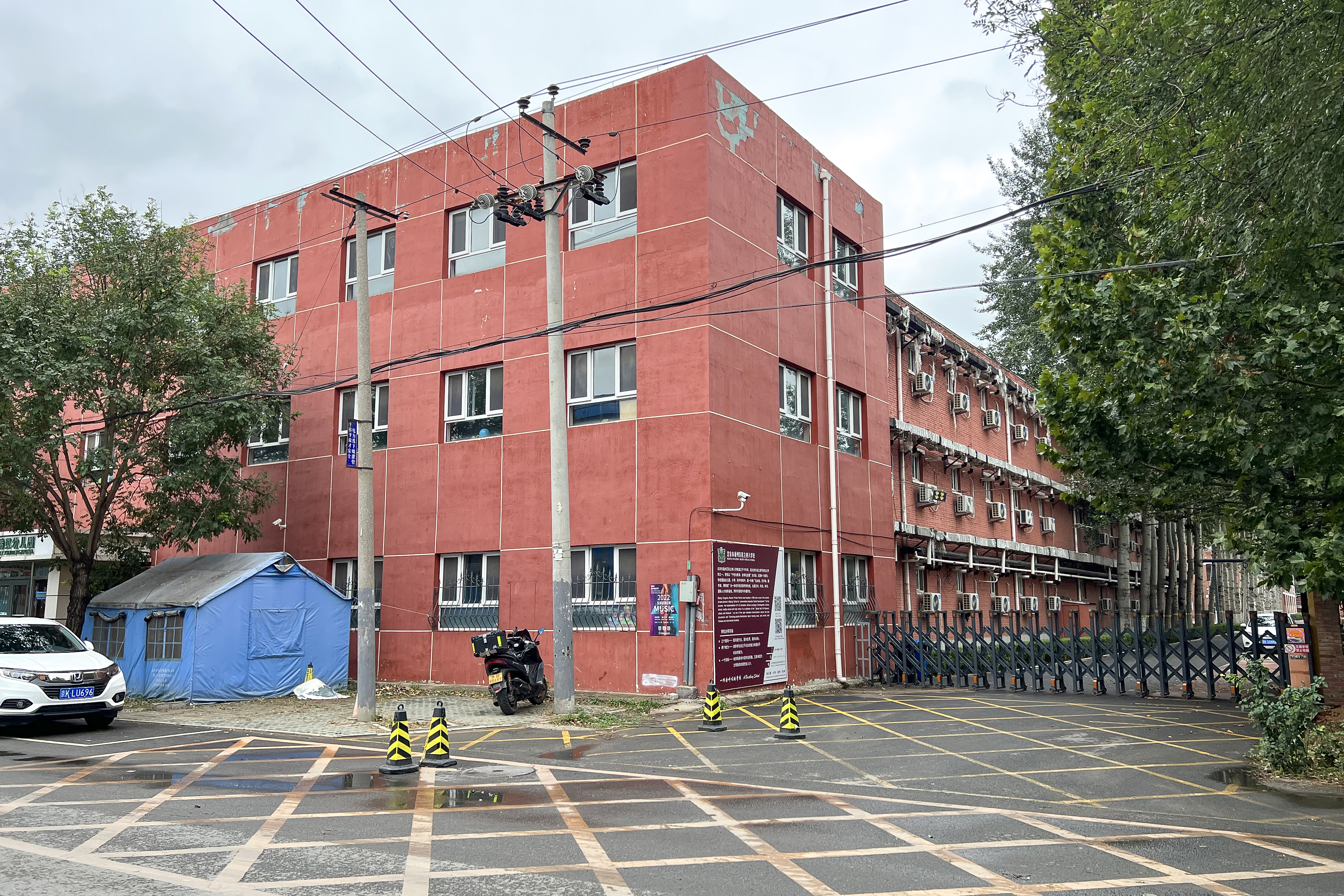
Tongzhou Shuren Private School building, 2022

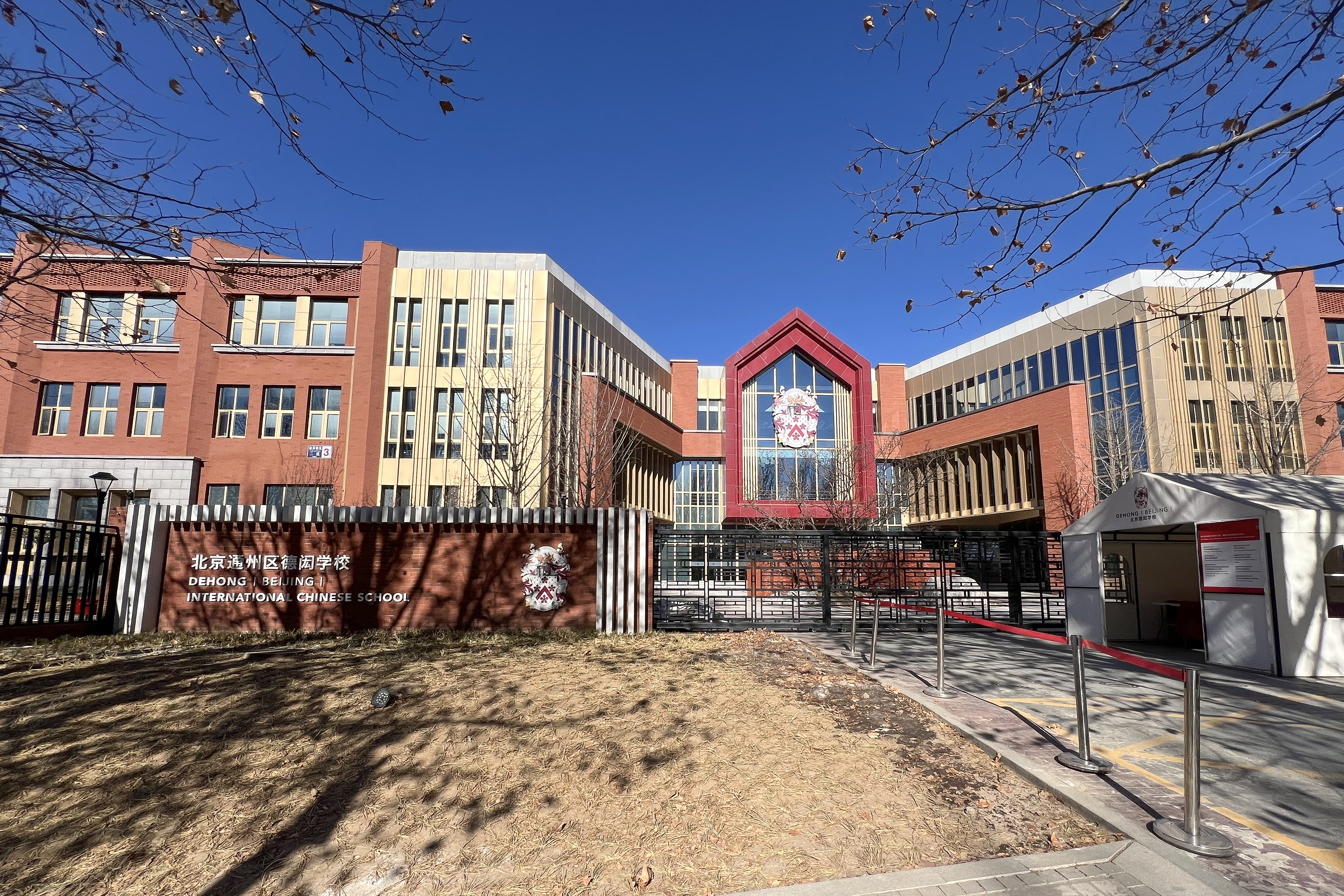
Dehong Beijing International Chinese School, 2024

== See also ==
- List of township-level divisions of Beijing
