= Ribet's theorem =

On properties of Galois representations associated with modular forms

Ribet's theorem (earlier called the epsilon conjecture or ε-conjecture) is part of number theory. It concerns properties of Galois representations associated with modular forms. It was proposed by Jean-Pierre Serre and proven by Ken Ribet. The proof was a significant step towards the proof of Fermat's Last Theorem (FLT). As shown by Serre and Ribet, the Taniyama–Shimura conjecture (whose status was unresolved at the time) and the epsilon conjecture together imply that FLT is true.

In mathematical terms, Ribet's theorem shows that if the Galois representation associated with an elliptic curve has certain properties, then that curve cannot be modular (in the sense that there cannot exist a modular form that gives rise to the same representation).

== Statement ==
Let f be a weight 2 newform on Γ_{0}(qN) – i.e. of level qN where q does not divide N – with absolutely irreducible 2-dimensional mod p Galois representation ρ_{f,p} unramified at q if q ≠ p and finite flat at q = p. Then there exists a weight 2 newform g of level N such that

$$\rho_{f,p} \simeq \rho_{g,p}.$$

In particular, if E is an elliptic curve over $\mathbb{Q}$ with conductor qN, then the modularity theorem guarantees that there exists a weight 2 newform f of level qN such that the 2-dimensional mod p Galois representation ρ_{f, p} of f is isomorphic to the 2-dimensional mod p Galois representation ρ_{E, p} of E. To apply Ribet's Theorem to ρ_{E, p}, it suffices to check the irreducibility and ramification of ρ_{E, p}. Using the theory of the Tate curve, one can prove that ρ_{E, p} is unramified at q ≠ p and finite flat at q = p if p divides the power to which q appears in the minimal discriminant Δ_{E}. Then Ribet's theorem implies that there exists a weight 2 newform g of level N such that ρ_{g, p} ≈ ρ_{E, p}.

== Level lowering ==
Ribet's theorem states that beginning with an elliptic curve E of conductor qN does not guarantee the existence of an elliptic curve E′ of level N such that ρ_{E, p} ≈ ρ_{E′, p}. The newform g of level N may not have rational Fourier coefficients, and hence may be associated to a higher-dimensional abelian variety, not an elliptic curve. For example, elliptic curve 4171a1 in the Cremona database given by the equation

$$E: y^2 + xy + y = x^3 - 663204x + 206441595$$

with conductor 43 × 97 and discriminant 43^{7} × 97^{3} does not level-lower mod 7 to an elliptic curve of conductor 97. Rather, the mod p Galois representation is isomorphic to the mod p Galois representation of an irrational newform g of level 97.

However, for p large enough compared to the level N of the level-lowered newform, a rational newform (e.g. an elliptic curve) must level-lower to another rational newform (e.g. elliptic curve). In particular for p ≫ N^{N^{1+ε}}, the mod p Galois representation of a rational newform cannot be isomorphic to an irrational newform of level N.

Similarly, the Frey-Mazur conjecture predicts that for large enough p (independent of the conductor N), elliptic curves with isomorphic mod p Galois representations are in fact isogenous, and hence have the same conductor. Thus non-trivial level-lowering between rational newforms is not predicted to occur for large p (p > 17).

== History ==
In his thesis, Yves Hellegouarch originated the idea of associating solutions (a,b,c) of Fermat's equation with a different mathematical object: an elliptic curve. If p is an odd prime and a, b, and c are positive integers such that

$$a^p + b^p = c^p,$$

then a corresponding Frey curve is an algebraic curve given by the equation

$$y^2 = x(x - a^p)(x + b^p).$$

This is a nonsingular algebraic curve of genus one defined over $\mathbb{Q}$, and its projective completion is an elliptic curve over $\mathbb{Q}$.

In 1982 Gerhard Frey called attention to the unusual properties of the same curve, now called a Frey curve. This provided a bridge between Fermat and Taniyama by showing that a counterexample to FLT would create a curve that would not be modular. The conjecture attracted considerable interest when Frey suggested that the Taniyama–Shimura conjecture implies FLT. However, his argument was not complete. In 1985 Jean-Pierre Serre proposed that a Frey curve could not be modular and provided a partial proof. This showed that a proof of the semistable case of the Taniyama–Shimura conjecture would imply FLT. Serre did not provide a complete proof and the missing bit became known as the epsilon conjecture or ε-conjecture. In the summer of 1986, Kenneth Alan Ribet proved the epsilon conjecture, thereby proving that the Modularity theorem implied FLT.

The origin of the name is from the ε part of "Taniyama-Shimura conjecture + ε ⇒ Fermat's last theorem".

== Implications ==
Suppose that the Fermat equation with exponent p ≥ 5 had a solution in non-zero integers a, b, c. The corresponding Frey curve E_{a^{p},b^{p},c^{p}} is an elliptic curve whose minimal discriminant Δ is equal to 2^{−8} (abc)^{2p} and whose conductor N is the radical of abc, i.e. the product of all distinct primes dividing abc. An elementary consideration of the equation a^{p} + b^{p} = c^{p}, makes it clear that one of a, b, c is even and hence so is N. By the Taniyama–Shimura conjecture, E is a modular elliptic curve. Since all odd primes dividing a, b, c in N appear to a pth power in the minimal discriminant Δ, by Ribet's theorem repetitive level descent modulo p strips all odd primes from the conductor. However, no newforms of level 2 remain because the genus of the modular curve X_{0}(2) is zero (and newforms of level N are differentials on X_{0}(N)).

== See also ==
- ABC conjecture
- Wiles' proof of Fermat's Last Theorem

== Notes ==
1. "The Proof of Fermat's Last Theorem". 2008-12-10. Archived from the original on 2008-12-10.
2. Silliman, Jesse; Vogt, Isabel (2015). "Powers in Lucas Sequences via Galois Representations". Proceedings of the American Mathematical Society. 143 (3): 1027–1041. arXiv:1307.5078. doi:10.1090/S0002-9939-2014-12316-1. MR 3293720. S2CID 16892383.
3. Hellegouarch, Yves (1972). "Courbes elliptiques et equation de Fermat". Doctoral Dissertation. BnF 359121326.
4. Frey, Gerhard (1982), "Rationale Punkte auf Fermatkurven und getwisteten Modulkurven" [Rational points on Fermat curves and twisted modular curves], J. Reine Angew. Math. (in German), 1982 (331): 185–191, doi:10.1515/crll.1982.331.185, MR 0647382, S2CID 118263144
5. Frey, Gerhard (1986), "Links between stable elliptic curves and certain Diophantine equations", Annales Universitatis Saraviensis. Series Mathematicae, 1 (1): iv+40, ISSN 0933-8268, MR 0853387
6. Serre, J.-P. (1987), "Lettre à J.-F. Mestre [Letter to J.-F. Mestre]", Current trends in arithmetical algebraic geometry (Arcata, Calif., 1985), Contemporary Mathematics (in French), vol. 67, Providence, RI: American Mathematical Society, pp. 263–268, doi:10.1090/conm/067/902597, ISBN 978-0-8218-5074-9, MR 0902597
7. Serre, Jean-Pierre (1987), "Sur les représentations modulaires de degré 2 de Gal(Q̅/Q)", Duke Mathematical Journal, 54 (1): 179–230, doi:10.1215/S0012-7094-87-05413-5, ISSN 0012-7094, MR 0885783
8. Ribet, Ken (1990). "On modular representations of Gal(Q̅/Q) arising from modular forms" (PDF). Inventiones Mathematicae. 100 (2): 431–476. Bibcode:1990InMat.100..431R. doi:10.1007/BF01231195. MR 1047143. S2CID 120614740.
