= Beijing Shuren Ribet Private School =

Private school in Beijing, China

Beijing Shuren-Ribet Private School
- 北京市私立树人•瑞贝学校
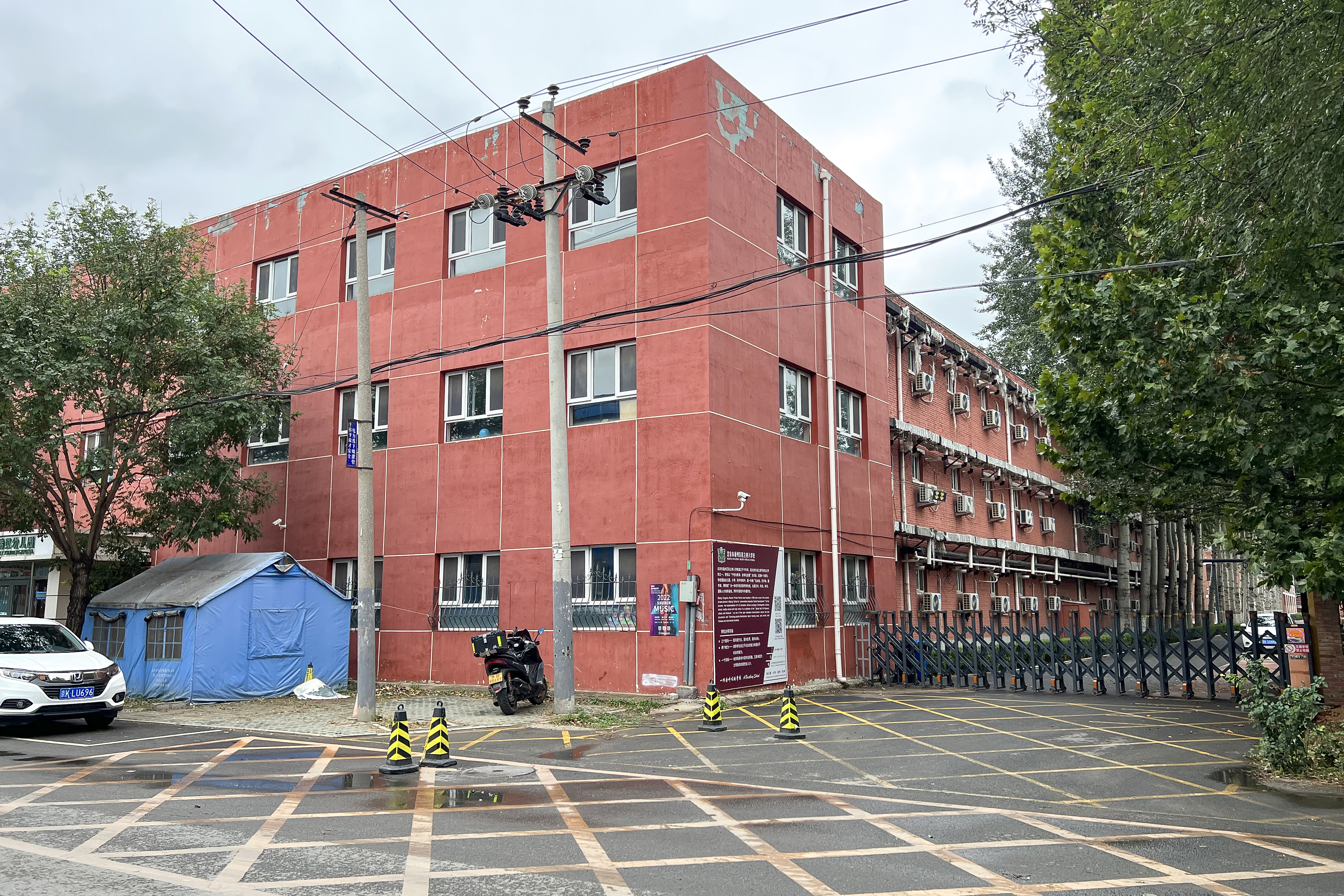
- Beijing Shuren-Ribet Private School
- Songzhuang, Tongzhou District; Beijing; China

Information
- Type: Private, day school, boarding school
- Founded: 1993
- Principal: Nancy Zhou (acting)
- Faculty: 7 faculty members from five different countries
- Grades: Nursery to Grade 12
- Website: http://www.shuren.org/

Beijing Shuren Ribet Private School
- Simplified Chinese: 北京市私立树人•瑞贝学校
- Traditional Chinese: 北京市私立樹人•瑞貝學校
Transcriptions
Standard Mandarin
- Hanyu Pinyin: Běijīng Shì Sīlì Shùrén Ruìbèi Xuéxiào

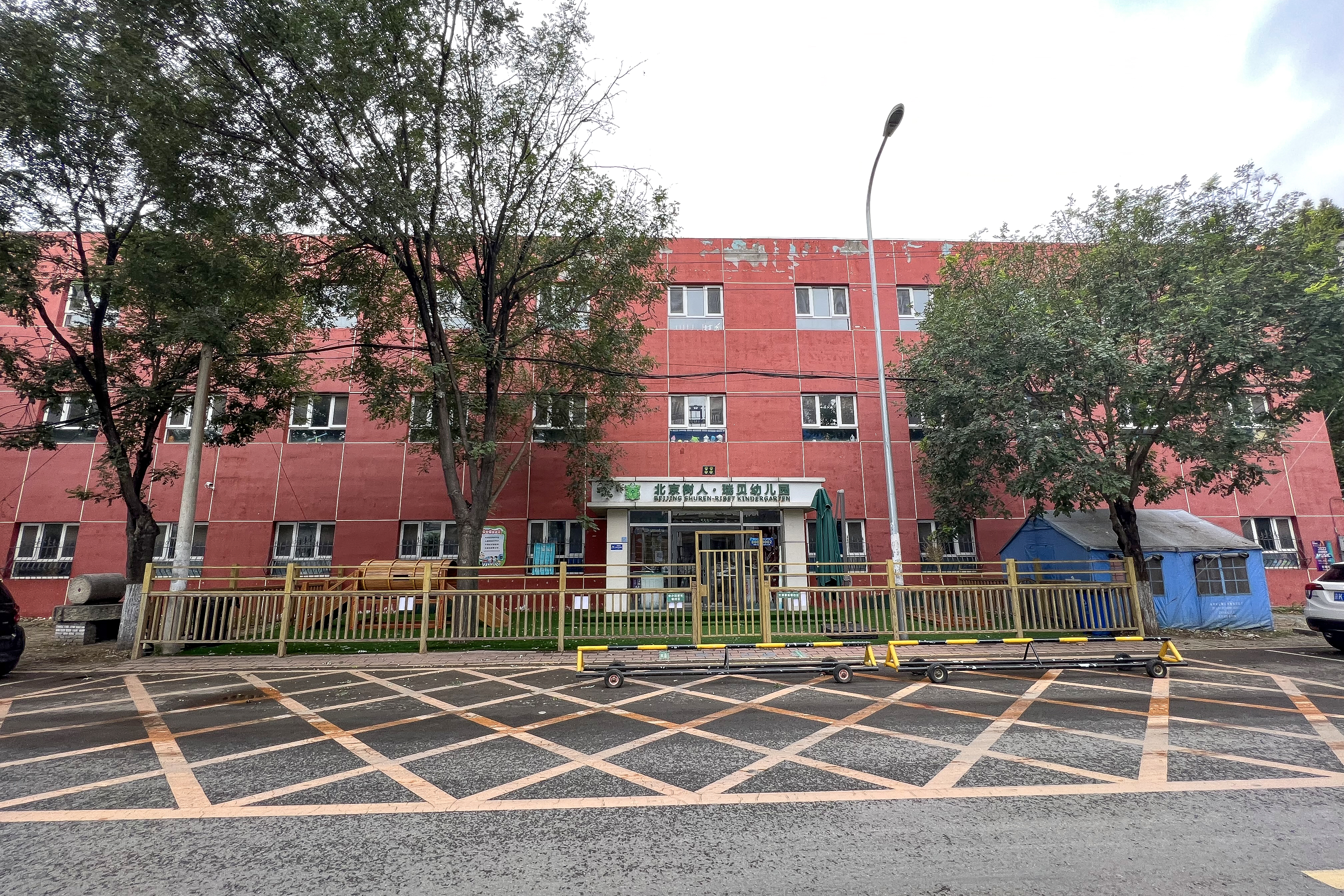
Kindergarten department

Beijing Shuren-Ribet Private School (SRPS; Chinese: 北京市私立树人•瑞贝学校) is a K-12 private school in Songzhuang, Tongzhou District, Beijing. It has both day and boarding programs.

Wang Jianchao, a former university professor, founded Beijing Shuren Private School in 1993. Beijing Shuren Private School and Los Angeles Ribét Academy started the school as a partnership. It is one of Beijing's oldest private schools. Honors Diploma, Advanced Diploma, and Standard Diploma are all available at the school.

== Notable alumni ==
- Vicky Chen
- Jiang Yiyi
- Wang Shengdi
