= Ken Ribet =

American mathematician

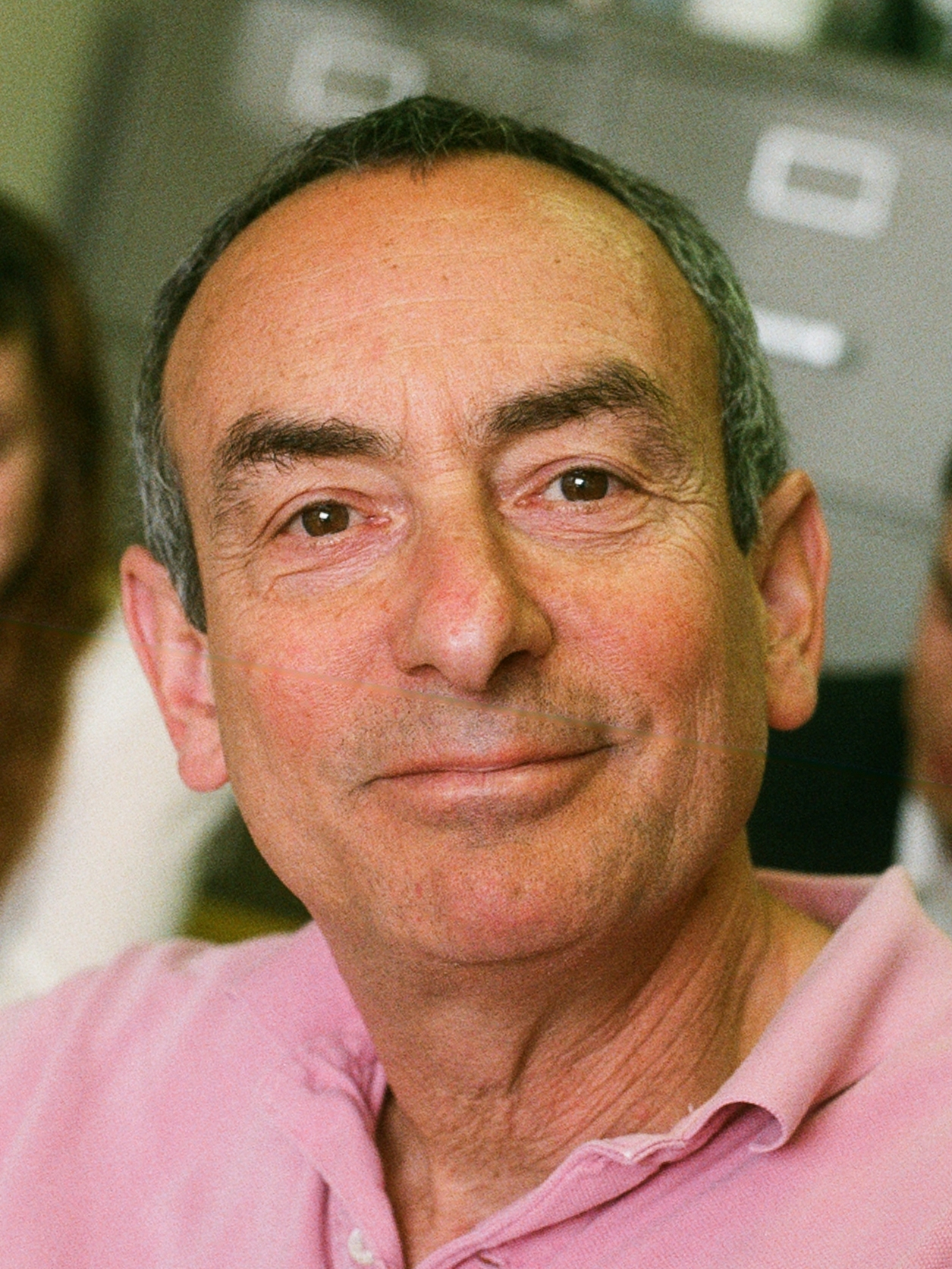
- Kenneth A. Ribet in 2013
- Born: June 28, 1948 (age 78)
- Education: Brown University (BA, MA); Harvard University (PhD)
- Known for: Ribet's lemma Ribet's theorem Herbrand–Ribet theorem
- Awards: Fermat Prize (1989); Fellow of the American Academy of Arts and Sciences (1997); Fellow of the National Academy of Sciences (2000); Fellow of the American Mathematical Society (2012); Brouwer Medal (2017)
- Scientific career
- Fields: Mathematics
- Workplaces: Princeton University; University of California, Berkeley
- Thesis: Galois action on division points of abelian varieties with real multiplications (1973)
- Doctoral advisor: John Tate
- Doctoral students: Frank Calegari; Samit Dasgupta; Bjorn Poonen

Kenneth Alan Ribet (/ˈrɪbɪt/; born June 28, 1948) is an American mathematician working in algebraic number theory and algebraic geometry. He is known for the Herbrand–Ribet theorem and Ribet's theorem, which were key ingredients in the proof of Fermat's Last Theorem, as well as for his service as President of the American Mathematical Society from 2017 to 2019. He is currently a professor of mathematics at the University of California, Berkeley.

== Early life and education ==
Kenneth Ribet was born in Brooklyn, New York to parents David Ribet and Pearl Ribet, both Jewish, on June 28, 1948. As a student at Far Rockaway High School, Ribet was on a competitive mathematics team, but his first field of study was chemistry.

Ribet earned his bachelor's degree and master's degree from Brown University in 1969. In 1973, Ribet received his Ph.D. from Harvard University under the supervision of John Tate.

== Career ==
After receiving his doctoral degree, Ribet taught at Princeton University for three years before spending two years doing research in Paris. In 1978, Ribet joined the Department of Mathematics at the University of California, Berkeley, where he served three separate terms as supervisor of the department's graduate program, supervisor of the department's undergraduate program, and supervisor of the department's development.

Ribet has served as an editor for several mathematics journals, a book series editor for the Cambridge University Press, and a book series editor for Springer. He also served on the United States National Committee for Mathematics, representing the United States at the International Mathematical Union, and was the Chair of the Mathematics section of the National Academy of Sciences.

From February 1, 2017 to January 31, 2019, Ribet was President of the American Mathematical Society.

== Research ==
Ribet's contributions in number theory and algebraic geometry were described by Benedict Gross and Barry Mazur as being "key to our understanding of the connections between the theory of modular forms and the ℓ-adic representations of the absolute Galois group of the field of rational numbers."

Ribet is credited with paving the way towards Andrew Wiles's proof of Fermat's Last Theorem. In 1986, Ribet proved that the epsilon conjecture formulated by Jean-Pierre Serre was true, and thereby proved that Fermat's Last Theorem would follow from the Taniyama–Shimura conjecture. Crucially it also followed that the full conjecture was not needed, but a special case, that of semistable elliptic curves, sufficed. An earlier theorem of Ribet's, the Herbrand–Ribet theorem, is the converse to Herbrand's theorem on the divisibility properties of Bernoulli numbers and is also related to Fermat's Last Theorem.

== Awards and honors ==
Ribet received the Fermat Prize in 1989 jointly with Abbas Bahri. He was elected to the American Academy of Arts and Sciences in 1997 and the National Academy of Sciences in 2000. In 2012, he became a Fellow of the American Mathematical Society. In 2017, Ribet received the Brouwer Medal. For 2025 Ribet was awarded the AMS Leroy P. Steele Prize for Seminal Contribution to Research.

In 1988, Ribet was inducted as a vigneron d'honneur by the Jurade de Saint-Émilion. In 1998, Ribet received an honorary doctorate from Brown University.

== Personal life ==
Ribet is married to statistician Lisa Goldberg.
