= List of things named after Jean-Pierre Serre =

The following things are named after Jean-Pierre Serre, a French mathematician.

- Bass–Serre theory
- Borel-Serre Compactification
- Grothendieck-Serre Correspondence
- Serre class
- Quillen–Suslin theorem (sometimes known as "Serre's Conjecture" or "Serre's problem")
- Serre's Conjecture concerning Galois representations
- Serre's "Conjecture II" concerning linear algebraic groups
- Serre's criterion (there are several of them.)
- Serre duality
- Serre–Grothendieck–Verdier duality
- Serre's FAC
- Serre fibration
- Serre's C-theory
- Serre's inequality on height
- Serre group
- Serre's modularity conjecture
- Serre's multiplicity conjectures
- Serre's open image theorem
- Serre's property FA
- Serre relations
- Serre subcategory
- Serre functor
- Serre spectral sequence
- Lyndon–Hochschild–Serre spectral sequence
- Serre–Swan theorem
- Serre–Tate theorem
- Serre's theorem in group cohomology
- Serre's theorem on affineness
- Serre twist sheaf
- Serre's vanishing theorem
- Serre weights
- Thin set in the sense of Serre

== See also ==
- Serre conjecture (disambiguation)
