= Josiane Serre =

French chemist and academic administrator (1922–2004)

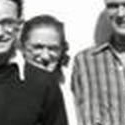
- Serre in 1949
- Born: Josiane Marie Mauricette Blanche Heulot; 17 December 1922; Lyon, France
- Died: 11 October 2004 (aged 81); Paris, France
- Education: University of Paris (PhD)
- Spouse: Jean-Pierre Serre
- Children: Claudine Monteil
- Scientific career
- Fields: Quantum chemistry
- Workplaces: École normale supérieure École normale supérieure de jeunes filles

Josiane Serre (17 December 1922 - 11 October 2004) was a French academic chemist, the final director of the l'École normale supérieure de jeunes filles, and acting director of l'École normale supérieure in Paris. A French pioneer of quantum chemistry, she is one of 72 women in STEM whose names have been proposed to be added to the Eiffel Tower.

== Early life and education ==
Josiane Marie Mauricette Blanche Heulot was born on 17 December 1922 in Lyon. She earned her baccalauréats in arts and sciences in 1940, then attended preparatory classes at the lycée Fénelon in Paris. After a period of illness, in 1944 she entered the l'École normale supérieure de jeunes filles in Sèvres.

Heulot passed the agrégation de sciences physiques examination in 1948 and earned a doctorate in chemistry at the University of Paris. After marriage to mathematician Jean-Pierre Serre she took his surname and became known as Josiane Serre.

== Career ==
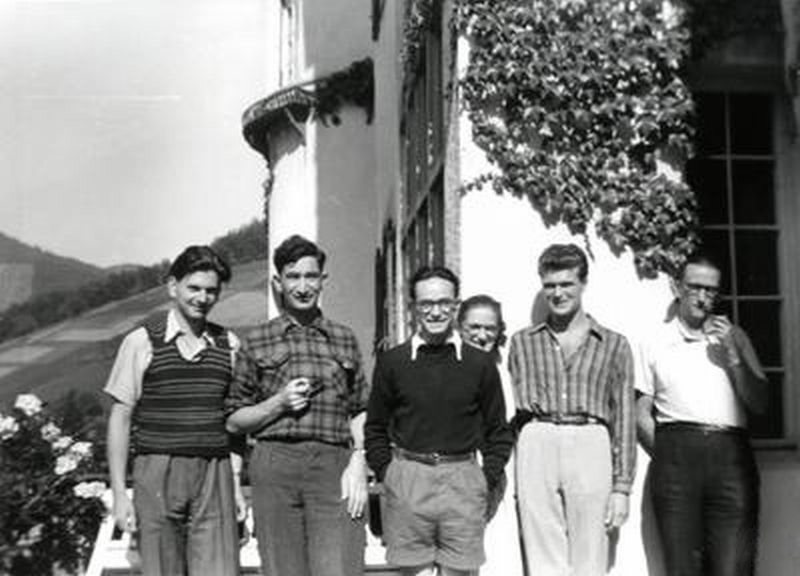
Left to right: René Thom, Jean Arbault, Jean-Pierre Serre, Josiane Serre, Jean Braconnier and Georges Reeb at the Oberwolfach Research Institute for Mathematics in 1949.

She initially worked in organic chemistry at the l'École normale supérieure de la rue d'Ulm where she conducted research on terpene derivatives. Whilst working there she suffered a serious laboratory accident in which she nearly lost the use of one hand. In January 1952, she switched to quantum chemistry at the Radium Institute, headed by Bernard and Alberte Pullman and Gaston Berthier. Her research focused on acetylenic compounds. Research focusing on the new field of quantum chemistry required mathematical analyses before computer processing of the data could be undertaken. Here Serre was able to collaborate with her husband Jean-Pierre Serre. During the 1960s, a research group on quantum chemistry was founded at the École normale supérieure, supervised by Josiane Serre.

After two years teaching in a secondary school, she moved into higher education teaching in 1950 at the École normale supérieure de jeunes filles (ENSJF). She was successively assistant, lecturer (1961–1972), professor, deputy director (1969–1974) and finally director of the École normale supérieure de jeunes filles (1974–1987). Serre encouraged ENSJF students to not limit themselves and to seek the same university positions as their male counterparts. She also worked to broadened the range of positions available to her students after they graduated from ENSJF, particularly in the Grands corps de l'État (French civil service) and in international positions.

Under her leadership the École Normale for Girls merged with the École Normale Supérieure on Rue d'Ulm. The merger of the two schools took place in 1985. The following years were marked by transition. From 1988 to 1991, Serre was part of the management team of the co-educational École normale supérieure (Paris).

In 1986, Serre recommended expanding recruitment to the grandes écoles in a report submitted to the Prime Minister of France.

After the death in 1989 of mathematician Georges Poitou, director of the École normale supérieure, Serre served as interim administrator from 1989 to 1990. She was the first woman to hold this position.

The same year, she was appointed to the Comité national d'évaluation des établissements publics à caractère scientifique, culturel et professionnel (National Committee for the Evaluation of Public Scientific, Cultural and Professional Institutions).

In 1991, she was appointed to the cabinet of the then Minister of National Education, Lionel Jospin, where she was responsible for the newly established instituts universitaires de formation des maîtres (university institutes for teacher training).

== Personal life and death ==
Josiane Heulot married mathematician Jean-Pierre Serre. The couple had one daughter, Claudine Monteil, diplomat and writer. Josiane Serre died in Paris on 11 October 2004.

== Recognition ==
She was made an Officer of the Legion of Honour on 23 May 1989.

In 2026, Serre was announced as one of 72 historical women in STEM whose names have been proposed to be added to the 72 men already celebrated on the Eiffel Tower. The plan was announced by the Mayor of Paris, Anne Hidalgo following the recommendations of a committee led by Isabelle Vauglin of Femmes et Sciences and Jean-François Martins, representing the operating company which runs the Eiffel Tower.

== Publications ==
- Josiane Serre, De l'École normale de professeurs femmes (Sèvres) à l'ENS de jeunes filles: 1881-1985, Bulletin de la Société des amis de l'ENS, 164, 1985, p. 13-20.
