= Stanisław Komorowski =

Polish diplomat and physicist

Stanisław Jerzy Komorowski
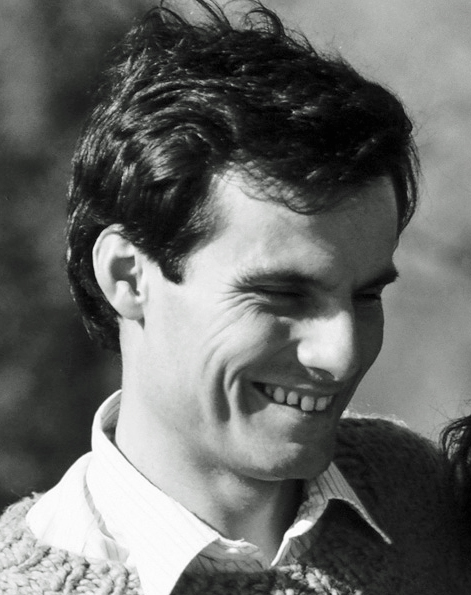
- Stanisław Komorowski, 1990
- Born: 18 December 1953; Warsaw, Poland
- Died: 10 April 2010 (aged 56); Smolensk, Russia
- Citizenship: Polish
- Education: Physics Department, University of Warsaw, Poland
- Spouse(s): Irena Komorowska, Maria Komorowska, Ewa Czartoryska
- Scientific career
- Fields: Physics
- Workplaces: Institute of Chemical Physics, Polish Academy of Sciences
- Doctoral advisor: W. Zielenkiewicz and Zbigniew Grabowski

Stanisław Jerzy Komorowski (18 December 1953 – 10 April 2010) was a Polish diplomat and physicist. He was long-term Polish Ambassador to Great Britain and the Netherlands, the Deputy Minister of National Defence and Deputy Foreign Affairs Minister. He was one of the new wave of Polish diplomats who reestablished Polish diplomatic services after the Polish Round Table Agreement.

== Life ==
=== Education and Physics ===
Komorowski was born in Warsaw, Poland. His parents were Henryk and Violetta Komorowski. He went to Limanowski High School in the Żoliborz quarter of Warsaw. He studied physics at the Physics Department at the University of Warsaw between 1972/73 and 1977/78 and graduated March 11, 1978 with a degree in biophysics. His M.Sc. was written under professor David Shugar and dealt with magnetic resonance.

In 1985, he was awarded a Ph.D. in physical chemistry for his work on photoacoustics. Between 1978 and 1990, he worked at the Institute of Physical Chemistry at the Polish Academy of Sciences, mostly collaborating with the Photochemistry and Spectroscopy group. In 1986 and for a half year between 1989 and 1990, he was a postdoctoral fellow at the Chemistry Department at the University of Utah in professor Edward Eyring's lab.

=== Diplomacy ===
He started his diplomatic career almost by chance, without any prior diplomatic experience, by applying for a position in the Foreign Ministry opened at the time by Minister Krzysztof Skubiszewski, who was seeking to renew diplomatic services in Poland after the regime change in 1989. In 1991, he was appointed as Skubiszewski's chief of staff. Between 1994 and 1998, he was the Polish ambassador to the Netherlands and, between 1999 and 2004, he was the Polish ambassador to Great Britain. He played a role behind the curtains in the diplomatic events leading to Poland's acceptance to NATO as well as the European Union. He was a part of a new wave of Polish diplomats that emerged along with Poland's new democratic government following the Polish Round Table Agreement.

He was Deputy Foreign Affairs Minister and between 2007 and 2010 Deputy Minister of the National Defense. In the Department of Defense he was responsible for foreign affairs and, among other tasks, he negotiated the US missile defense system to be deployed in Poland.

The US Ambassador Feinstein said "Minister Komorowski was our invaluable partner on bilateral defense issues of vital importance to both countries, including Missile Defense and the upcoming rotation of Patriot Missiles in Poland. With Minister Komorowski seated across the table from our negotiators during U.S.-Polish talks on a Status of Forces Agreement, we knew we would come up with an agreement that met both sides’ needs, and we did. His energy, his leadership and his mastery of security issues will be sorely missed by his American colleagues at the United States Departments of State and Defense. America mourns a true friend."

=== Interests ===
He was an avid skier and ski instructor as well as tennis player. During his university years, he was an active member of the Academic Ski Association (his father was a member of the International Ski Federation) and during his high school years he skied with members of the Catholic Intelligentsia Club (pol. Klub Inteligencji Katolickiej). One of his passions was parks and gardens and, for a short time in 1990, he had a small gardening company; with his wife Maria Komorowska they created three gardens before they closed the company. His other passion was French culture; as a student he spent his vacations in France with Dziadulski family. Later, at the end of his life, he rebuilt the garden at the Komorowski’s Dziewanna villa on the outskirts of Warsaw. He was married three times and had three sons – Karol and Maciej with Irena Komorowska and Jerzy with Maria Komorowska. His third wife was Ewa Komorowska.

=== Death ===
He was listed on the flight manifest of the Tupolev Tu-154 of the 36th Special Aviation Regiment carrying the President of Poland Lech Kaczyński which crashed near Smolensk-North airport near Pechersk near Smolensk, Russia, on 10 April 2010, killing all aboard. At the last moment he replaced Polish defense minister Bogdan Klich and traveled to Smolensk. He was buried on April 16, 2010 at Powązki Cemetery in Komorowski's family grave (#116/VI). During the church ceremony a tennis racket was placed on his coffin. Members of the government including prime minister and president of Poland were in attendance. He was decorated, posthumously, with the Commander's Cross of the Order of Polonia Restituta.

== Selected scientific publications ==
- E.M. Eyring, N.F. Leite, S.J. Komorowski, and T. Masujima, "Photoacoustic Instrumentation," in Analytical Instrumentation Handbook, G.W. Ewing, Ed., Marcel Dekker, Inc.: New York, 1990, Chapter 10, pp. 337–360.
- D.P. Cobranchi, N.F. Leite, J. Isak, S.J. Komorowski, A. Gerhard, and E. M. Eyring, "Pulsed Laser Photothermal Radiometry and Photothermal Beam Deflection Spectroscopy: Determination of Thermal Diffusivities of Liquids," in Photoacoustic and Photothermal Phenomena II (Springer Series in Optical Sciences, Vol. 62), J.C. Murphy, J.W. Maclachlan-Spicer, L. Aamodt, and B.S.H. Royce, Eds., Springer-Verlag: Berlin, Germany, 1990, pp. 328–330.
- Isak S.J., S.J. Komorowski, C.N. Merrow, P.E. Poston, E.M. Eyring, 1989, Thermal lens measurements in liquids on a submicronsecond time scale, Applied Spectroscopy, 43, 419–422.
- Komorowski S.J., I. Ekiel, E. Darzynkiewicz, D. Shugar, 1981, C-13-NMR analysis of the effects of dissociation of the hydroxyl groups of 1-beta-d-arabinofuranosylcytosine and its O'-methyl derivatives on conformation, Carbohydrate Research, 89, 21–32.
- Komorowski S.J., Z. R. Grabowski, and W. Zielenkiewicz, 1985, Pulsed photoacoustic determination of the quantum yield of triplet-state formation, Journal of Photochemistry, 30, 141-151.
- Komorowski S.J., E.M. Eyring, 1987, Pulse shapes of nanosecond photoacoustic signals in liquids detected by piezoelectric foil, Journal of Applied Physics, 62, 3066–3069.
- Mordzinski A., S.J. Komorowski, 1985, Electronic relaxation on aza derivatives of 1,2 benzanthracene and their protonated forms – a comparative study of the quantum yield of triplet state formation, Chemical Physics Letters, 114, 172–177.
- Sabbah R., S.J. Komorowski, 1980, Enthalpie de sublimation de la diéthyl-1,3 thymine, Thermochimica Acta, 41, 379–381.
- Waluk J., S.J. Komorowski, 1986, Solvent-dependent photophysics of indoloquinoxaline, Journal of Molecular Structure, 142, 159–162.
- Waluk J., S.J. Komorowski, J. Herbich, 1986, Excited state double proton treatment in 1-azacarbazole alcohol complexes, Journal of Physical Chemistry, 90, 3868–3871.
- Waluk J., S.J. Komorowski, 1987, Modification of photophysical behavior by hydrogen bonding indoloquinoxaline and its methylated derivatives, Chemical Physics Letters, 133, 368–372.
- Waluk J., B. Pakula, S.J. Komorowski, 1987, Photophysics of pseudoazulenes 7-azaindole derivatives, Journal of Photochemistry, 39, 49–58.
