= Roger Temam =

French mathematician

Roger Meyer Temam
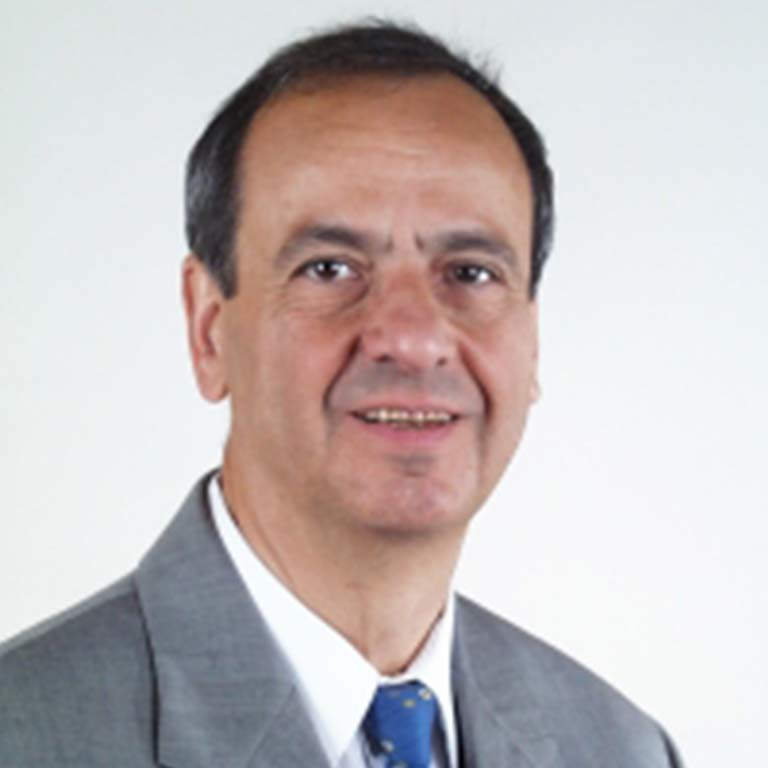
- Born: 19 May 1940 (age 86); Tunis
- Education: University of Paris
- Known for: Navier–Stokes equations
- Scientific career
- Fields: Applied mathematics
- Workplaces: Paris-Sud University (Orsay); Indiana University
- Doctoral advisor: Jacques-Louis Lions
- Doctoral students: Etienne Pardoux, Denis Serre

Roger Meyer Temam (born 19 May 1940) is a French mathematician and Professor Emeritus of Mathematics working in the fields of numerical analysis, nonlinear partial differential equations and fluid mechanics. He is known for his contributions to the theory of the Navier–Stokes equations and to numerical analysis. He has published over 400 articles, as well as 12 (authored or co-authored) books. The influence of Roger Temam in the development of applied mathematics in France, as well as all over the world, has been essential. His scientific aura and influence can also be measured in the number of doctoral theses which were written under his guidance, both in France and in the United States. According to the Mathematics Genealogy Project, Temam has also supervised 127 doctoral theses, the second-highest number supervised by an individual in the field of mathematics. He has a total of 654 mathematical "descendants," including Denis Serre.

== Early life and education ==
Roger Temam was born in Tunis, into a Jewish family. He moved to France at the age of 17 and enrolled at the University of Paris – the Sorbonne to study Mathematics. In 1960, he became an assistant at the Faculty of Mechanics of the Faculty of Sciences of Paris. There, Temam worked under the direction of Jacques-Louis Lions, earned his agrégation in mathematics in 1962, and completed his doctorate (Thèse d'Etat) in 1967.

After completing his studies, Temam became a Maître de Conférences (Associate Professor) at Paris-Sud University, Orsay in 1968 and later a full Professor where he remained until 2003. He was also a Maître de Conférences at the Ecole Polytechnique in Paris from 1968 to 1986.

Together with Professors Jacques Deny and Charles Goulaouic, he founded the Laboratory of Numerical and Functional Analysis in Orsay, which he directed from 1972 to 1988.

He was the director of the doctoral program in Numerical Analysis at Orsay from 1975 to 1994, and director of the Mathematics Laboratory at Orsay between 1977 and 1980. He was also a member of the scientific council of CISI from 1989 to 1995 and served multiple terms on the National Council of Universities.

In parallel, he also served as a scientific advisor at INRIA from 1968 to 1984 and at CISI (the CEA's computing-engineering subsidiary) from 1974 to 2000. He co-organized multiple national and international scientific events, and was a member of the editorial boards of several prestigious scientific journals, including ESAIM: Mathematical Modelling and Numerical Analysis.

In 1983, Temam co-founded the French Société de Mathématiques Appliquées et Industrielles (SMAI), analogous to the Society for Industrial and Applied Mathematics (SIAM), and served as its first president.

Between 1983 and 1987, Temam was a member of the National Committee for Mathematics of the CNRS, head of the "Doctoral training" expert group in mathematics.

He was also one of the founders of the International Congress on Industrial and Applied Mathematics (ICIAM) series and the chair of the steering committee of the first ICIAM meeting held in Paris in 1987; and then the chair of the standing committee of the second ICIAM meeting held in Washington, D.C., in 1991. He was the Editor-in-Chief of the mathematical journal M2AN from 1986 to 1997.

In addition to his scientific activities in France, Temam came to Indiana University in 1986 to work with Ciprian Foias. In Bloomington, Indiana, he was offered a position at the university while retaining his roles in France. This is how Temam became a professor of mathematics and the director of the Institute for Scientific Computing and Applied Mathematics (ISCAM) at Indiana University since 1986 (co-director with Ciprian Foias from 1986 to 1992). He was promoted to Distinguished Professor Emeritus in 2013.

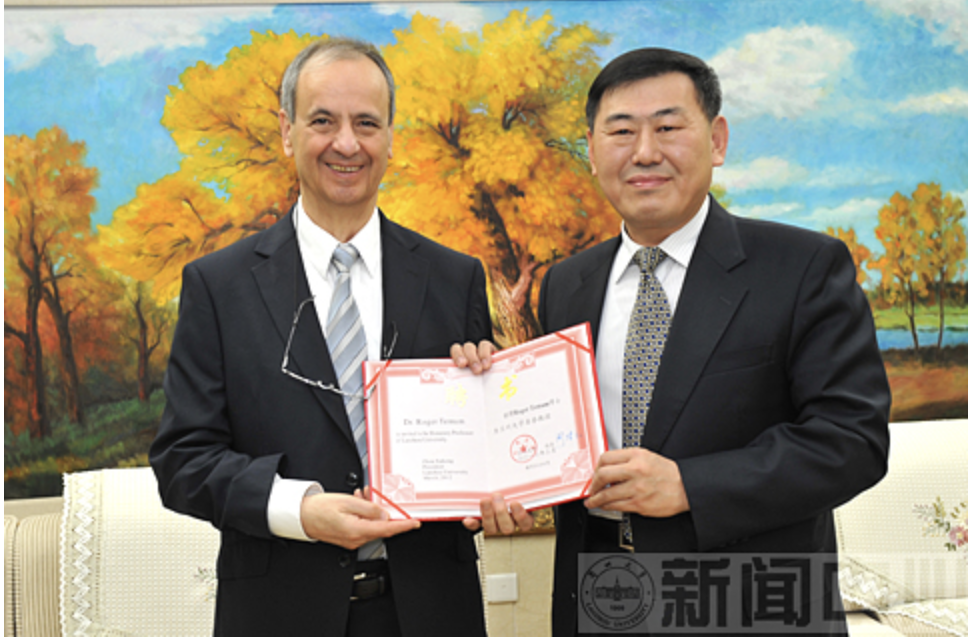
Dr. Temam is appointed Honorary Professor at Lanzhou University, China, June 2012

== Scientific work ==
Roger Temam's scientific work lies at the intersection of mathematical analysis, numerical analysis, and scientific computing. It encompasses mathematical modeling and analysis, as well as the development of new numerical methods.

His first work, carried out in his doctoral thesis, focused on the method of fractional steps. He since has "continued to explore and develop new directions and techniques" including:

- calculus of variations, and the notion of duality, developing the mathematical framework for discontinuous (in displacement) solutions; a concept later used for his works on the mathematical theory of plasticity;
- mathematical formulation of the equilibrium of a plasma in a cavity, expressed as a nonlinear free boundary problem;
- Korteweg–de Vries equation;
- Kuramoto–Sivashinsky equation;
- Euler equations in a bounded domain;
- optimal control of the incompressible Navier–Stokes equations as a tool for the control of turbulence;
- boundary layer phenomena for incompressible flows.
- Helped establish the modern theory of infinite-dimensional dynamical systems. In particular, he investigated the existence of finite-dimensional global attractors for many dissipative equations in mathematical physics, including the incompressible Navier–Stokes equations. Together with Peter Constantin, Ciprian Foias, and Oscar Manley, he obtained an almost sharp, physically meaningful upper bound on the dimension of the global attractor.
- Co-founded the concepts of inertial manifolds together with Ciprian Foias and George R. Sell and of exponential attractors with Alp Eden, Ciprian Foias and Basil Nicolaenko

Temam's later applications concern the study of geophysical flows, the atmosphere and oceans. This started in the 1990s by collaboration with Jacques-Louis Lions and Shouhong Wang.

He has published over 400 articles, as well as 12 (authored or co-authored) books.

Of all Mathematics advisors recorded by the Mathematical Genealogy Project database, Temam has the second-largest number of doctoral students. More than 30 of his students are now full professors all over the world, and have themselves many "descendants."

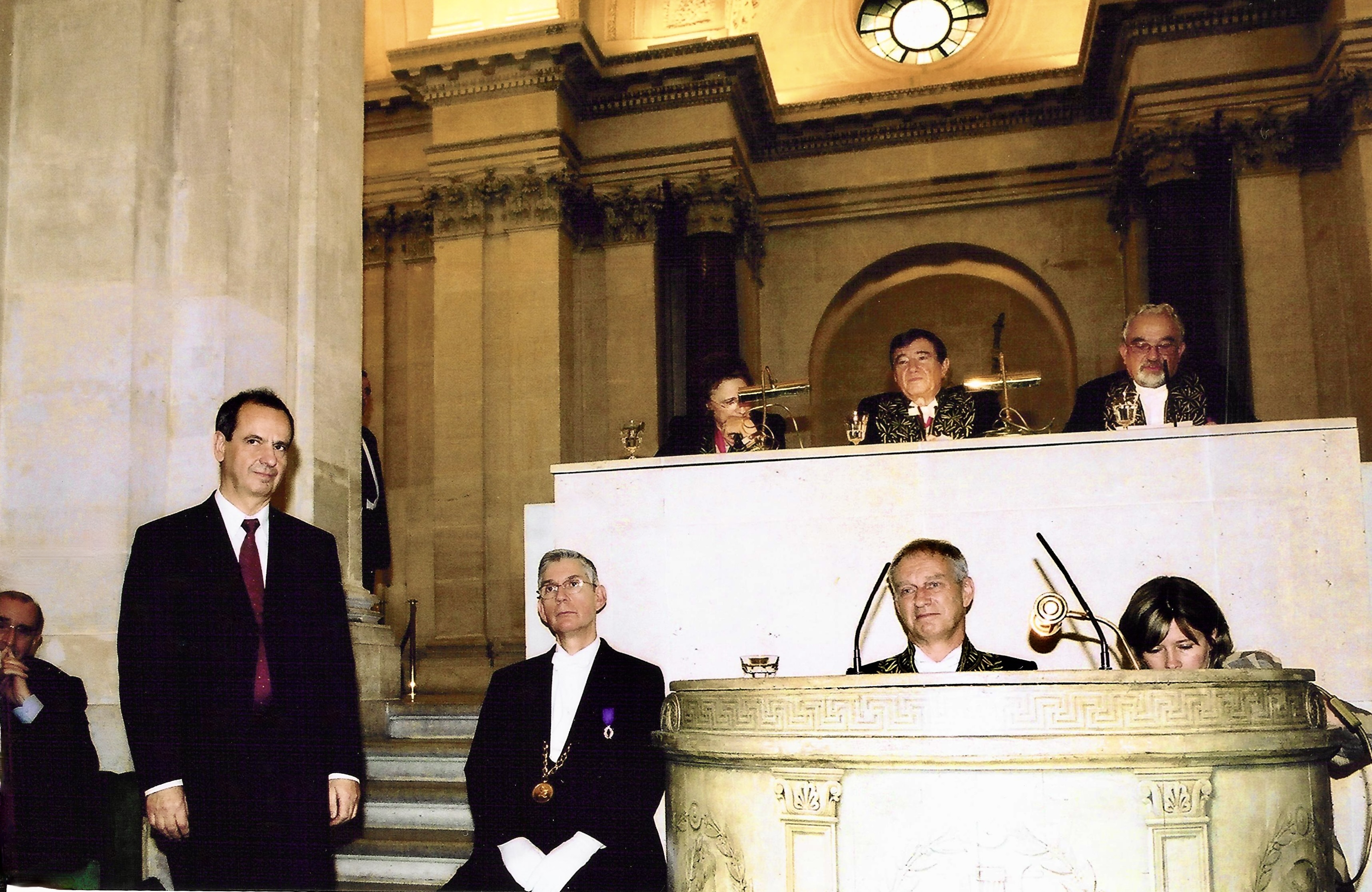
Roger Temam (standing) is elected at the American Academy of Arts and Sciences, April 2015

== Awards and honors ==
  - Peccot Prize, Collège de France (1970)
  - Invited speaker at the International Congress of Mathematicians, Nice — "Some Decomposition Methods in Numerical Analysis" (1970)
  - Carrière Prize, French Academy of Sciences (1977)
  - Seymour Cray Prize for Numerical Simulation (1989)
  - Alexandre-Joannidès Prize, French Academy of Sciences (1993)
  - Honorary Professor, Fudan University, Shanghai (1996)
  - Jacques-Louis Lions Prize, French Academy of Sciences (2003)
  - Elected Member, French Academy of Sciences (11 December 2007)
  - Knight of the Legion of Honor (Chevalier de la Légion d'honneur), France, 2012.
  - Fellow, American Mathematical Society (2012)
  - Elected Member, American Academy of Arts and Sciences (2015),
  - ISIMM Prize, Darmstadt University of Technology (2016)

== Books ==
- Temam, Roger (1973). Numerical analysis. Translated by Nienhuys, J. W. Boston, MA: D. Reidel Publishing Company. doi:10.1007/978-94-010-2565-2. ISBN 978-90-277-0308-8. MR 0347099. Zbl 0261.65001.
- Temam, Roger (1984). Navier–Stokes equations. Theory and numerical analysis. Studies in Mathematics and its Applications. Vol. 2. With an appendix by F. Thomasset (Third edition of 1977 original ed.). Amsterdam: North-Holland Publishing Company. doi:10.1090/chel/343. ISBN 0-444-87558-1. MR 0769654. Zbl 0568.35002.
- Constantin, P.; Foias, C.; Nicolaenko, B.; Temam, R. (1989). Integral manifolds and inertial manifolds for dissipative partial differential equations. Applied Mathematical Sciences. Vol. 70. New York: Springer-Verlag. doi:10.1007/978-1-4612-3506-4. ISBN 0-387-96729-X. MR 0966192. Zbl 0683.58002.
- Eden, A.; Foias, C.; Nicolaenko, B.; Temam, R. (1994). Exponential attractors for dissipative evolution equations. Research in Applied Mathematics. Vol. 37. Chichester: John Wiley & Sons, Ltd. ISBN 0-471-95223-0. MR 1335230. Zbl 0842.58056.
- Temam, Roger (1995). Navier–Stokes equations and nonlinear functional analysis. CBMS–NSF Regional Conference Series in Applied Mathematics. Vol. 66 (Second edition of 1983 original ed.). Philadelphia, PA: Society for Industrial and Applied Mathematics. doi:10.1137/1.9781611970050. ISBN 0-89871-340-4. MR 1318914. Zbl 0833.35110.
- Temam, Roger (1997). Infinite-dimensional dynamical systems in mechanics and physics. Applied Mathematical Sciences. Vol. 68 (Second edition of 1988 original ed.). New York: Springer-Verlag. doi:10.1007/978-1-4612-0645-3. ISBN 0-387-94866-X. MR 1441312. Zbl 0871.35001.
- Dubois, Thierry; Jauberteau, François; Temam, Roger (1999). Dynamic multilevel methods and the numerical simulation of turbulence. Cambridge: Cambridge University Press. ISBN 0-521-62165-8. MR 1695881. Zbl 0958.76002.
- Ekeland, Ivar; Témam, Roger (1999). Convex analysis and variational problems. Classics in Applied Mathematics. Vol. 28 (Corrected reprint of the 1976 English edition of 1974 French original ed.). Philadelphia, PA: Society for Industrial and Applied Mathematics. doi:10.1137/1.9781611971088. ISBN 0-89871-450-8. MR 1727362. Zbl 0939.49002.
- Foias, C.; Manley, O.; Rosa, R.; Temam, R. (2001). Navier–Stokes equations and turbulence. Encyclopedia of Mathematics and its Applications. Vol. 83. Cambridge: Cambridge University Press. doi:10.1017/CBO9780511546754. ISBN 0-521-36032-3. MR 1855030. Zbl 0994.35002.
- Temam, Roger; Miranville, Alain (2005). Mathematical modeling in continuum mechanics (Second edition of 2001 original ed.). Cambridge: Cambridge University Press. doi:10.1017/CBO9780511755422. ISBN 978-0-521-61723-9. MR 2169020. Zbl 1077.76001.
- Gie, Gung-Min; Hamouda, Makram; Jung, Chang-Yeol; Temam, Roger M. (2018). Singular perturbations and boundary layers. Applied Mathematical Sciences. Vol. 200. Springer, Cham. doi:10.1007/978-3-030-00638-9. ISBN 978-3-030-00637-2. MR 3839343. Zbl 1411.35002.
- Temam, Roger (2018). Mathematical problems in plasticity. Translated by Orde, L. S. (Reprint of the 1985 English translation of 1983 French original ed.). Mineola, NY: Dover Publications. ISBN 978-0-486-82827-5. MR 0711964. Zbl 1406.74002.
