= Kazhdan's property (T) =

Mathematics term

In mathematics, a locally compact topological group G has property (T) if the trivial representation is an isolated point in its unitary dual equipped with the Fell topology. Informally, this means that if G acts unitarily on a Hilbert space and has "almost invariant vectors", then it has a nonzero invariant vector. The formal definition, introduced by David Kazhdan (1967), gives this a precise, quantitative meaning.

Although originally defined in terms of irreducible representations, property (T) can often be checked even when there is little or no explicit knowledge of the unitary dual. Property (T) has important applications to group representation theory, lattices in algebraic groups over local fields, ergodic theory, geometric group theory, expanders, operator algebras and the theory of networks.

== Definitions ==
Let G be a σ-compact, locally compact topological group and π : G → U(H) a unitary representation of G on a (complex) Hilbert space H. If ε > 0 and K is a compact subset of G, then a unit vector ξ in H is called an (ε, K)-invariant vector if

$$\forall g \in K \ : \ \left \|\pi(g) \xi - \xi \right \| < \varepsilon.$$

The following conditions on G are all equivalent to G having property (T) of Kazhdan, and any of them can be used as the definition of property (T).

(1) The trivial representation is an isolated point of the unitary dual of G with Fell topology.

(2) Any sequence of continuous positive definite functions on G converging to 1 uniformly on compact subsets, converges to 1 uniformly on G.

(3) Every unitary representation of G that has an (ε, K)-invariant unit vector for any ε > 0 and any compact subset K, has a non-zero invariant vector.

(4) There exists an ε > 0 and a compact subset K of G such that every unitary representation of G that has an (ε, K)-invariant unit vector, has a nonzero invariant vector.

(5) Every continuous affine isometric action of G on a real Hilbert space has a fixed point (property (FH)).

If H is a closed subgroup of G, the pair (G,H) is said to have relative property (T) of Margulis if there exists an ε > 0 and a compact subset K of G such that whenever a unitary representation of G has an (ε, K)-invariant unit vector, then it has a non-zero vector fixed by H.

== Discussion ==
Definition (4) evidently implies definition (3). To show the converse, let G be a locally compact group satisfying (3), assume by contradiction that for every K and ε there is a unitary representation that has a (K, ε)-invariant unit vector and does not have an invariant vector. Look at the direct sum of all such representation and that will negate (4).

The equivalence of (4) and (5) (Property (FH)) is the Delorme-Guichardet theorem. The fact that (5) implies (4) requires the assumption that G is σ-compact (and locally compact) (Bekka et al., Theorem 2.12.4).

== General properties ==
- Property (T) is preserved under quotients: if G has property (T) and H is a quotient group of G then H has property (T). Equivalently, if a homomorphic image of a group G does not have property (T) then G itself does not have property (T).
- If G has property (T) then G/[G, G] is compact.
- Any countable discrete group with property (T) is finitely generated.
- An amenable group which has property (T) is necessarily compact. Amenability and property (T) are in a rough sense opposite: they make almost invariant vectors easy or hard to find.
- Kazhdan's theorem: If Γ is a lattice in a Lie group G then Γ has property (T) if and only if G has property (T). Thus for n ≥ 3, the special linear group SL(n, Z) has property (T).

== Examples ==
- Compact topological groups have property (T). In particular, the circle group, the additive group Z_{p} of p-adic integers, compact special unitary groups SU(n) and all finite groups have property (T).
- Simple real Lie groups of real rank at least two have property (T). This family of groups includes the special linear groups SL(n, R) for n ≥ 3 and the special orthogonal groups SO(p,q) for p > q ≥ 2 and SO(p,p) for p ≥ 3. More generally, this holds for simple algebraic groups of rank at least two over a local field.
- The pairs (R^{n} ⋊ SL(n, R), R^{n}) and (Z^{n} ⋊ SL(n, Z), Z^{n}) have relative property (T) for n ≥ 2.
- For n ≥ 2, the noncompact Lie group Sp(n, 1) of isometries of a quaternionic hermitian form of signature (n,1) is a simple Lie group of real rank 1 that has property (T). By Kazhdan's theorem, lattices in this group have property (T). This construction is significant because these lattices are hyperbolic groups; thus, there are groups that are hyperbolic and have property (T). Explicit examples of groups in this category are provided by arithmetic lattices in Sp(n, 1) and certain quaternionic reflection groups.

Examples of groups that do not have property (T) include

- The additive groups of integers Z, of real numbers R and of p-adic numbers Q_{p}.
- The special linear groups SL(2, Z) and SL(2, R), as a result of the existence of complementary series representations near the trivial representation, although SL(2,Z) has property (τ) with respect to principal congruence subgroups, by Selberg's theorem.
- Noncompact solvable groups.
- Nontrivial free groups and free abelian groups.

== Discrete groups ==
Historically property (T) was established for discrete groups Γ by embedding them as lattices in real or p-adic Lie groups with property (T). There are now several direct methods available.

- The algebraic method of Shalom applies when Γ = SL(n, R) with R a ring and n ≥ 3; the method relies on the fact that Γ can be boundedly generated, i.e. can be expressed as a finite product of easier subgroups, such as the elementary subgroups consisting of matrices differing from the identity matrix in one given off-diagonal position.
- The geometric method has its origins in ideas of Garland, Gromov and Pierre Pansu. Its simplest combinatorial version is due to Zuk: let Γ be a discrete group generated by a finite subset S, closed under taking inverses and not containing the identity, and define a finite graph with vertices S and an edge between g and h whenever g^{−1}h lies in S. If this graph is connected and the smallest non-zero eigenvalue of the Laplacian of the corresponding simple random walk is greater than 1/2, then Γ has property (T). A more general geometric version, due to Zuk and Ballmann & Swiatkowski (1997), states that if a discrete group Γ acts properly discontinuously and cocompactly on a contractible 2-dimensional simplicial complex with the same graph theoretic conditions placed on the link at each vertex, then Γ has property (T). Many new examples of hyperbolic groups with property (T) can be exhibited using this method.
- The computer-assisted method is based on a suggestion by Narutaka Ozawa and has been successfully implemented by several researchers. It is based on the algebraic characterization of property (T) in terms of an inequality in the real group algebra, for which a solution may be found by solving a noncommutative analog of the sum of squares hierarchy of semidefinite programming problems numerically on a computer. Notably, this method has confirmed property (T) for the automorphism group of the free group of rank at least 5. No human proof is known for this result.

== Applications ==
- Grigory Margulis used the fact that SL(n, Z) (for n ≥ 3) has property (T) to construct explicit families of expanding graphs, that is, graphs with the property that every subset has a uniformly large "boundary". This connection led to a number of recent studies giving an explicit estimate of Kazhdan constants, quantifying property (T) for a particular group and a generating set.
- Alain Connes used discrete groups with property (T) to find examples of type II_{1} factors with countable fundamental group, so in particular not the whole of positive reals $\mathbb{R}^{+}$. Sorin Popa subsequently used relative property (T) for discrete groups to produce a type II_{1} factor with trivial fundamental group.
- Groups with property (T) also have Serre's property FA.
- Toshikazu Sunada observed that the positivity of the bottom of the spectrum of a "twisted" Laplacian on a closed manifold is related to property (T) of the fundamental group. This observation yields Brooks' result which says that the bottom of the spectrum of the Laplacian on the universal covering manifold over a closed Riemannian manifold M equals zero if and only if the fundamental group of M is amenable.
