= Boundedly generated group =

In mathematics, a group is called boundedly generated if it can be expressed as a finite product of cyclic subgroups. The property of bounded generation is also closely related with the congruence subgroup problem (see Lubotzky & Segal 2003).

== Definitions ==
A group G is called boundedly generated if there exists a finite subset S of G and a positive integer m such that every element g of G can be represented as a product of at most m powers of the elements of S:

$g = s_1^{k_1} \cdots s_m^{k_m},$ where $s_i \in S$ and $k_i$ are integers.

The finite set S generates G, so a boundedly generated group is finitely generated.

An equivalent definition can be given in terms of cyclic subgroups. A group G is called boundedly generated if there is a finite family C_{1}, …, C_{M} of not necessarily distinct cyclic subgroups such that G = C_{1}…C_{M} as a set.

== Properties ==
- Bounded generation is unaffected by passing to a subgroup of finite index: if H is a finite index subgroup of G then G is boundedly generated if and only if H is boundedly generated.
- Bounded generation goes to extension: if a group G has a normal subgroup N such that both N and G/N are boundedly generated, then so is G itself.
- Any quotient group of a boundedly generated group is also boundedly generated.
- A finitely generated torsion group must be finite if it is boundedly generated; equivalently, an infinite finitely generated torsion group is not boundedly generated.

A pseudocharacter on a discrete group G is defined to be a real-valued function f on a G such that

f(gh) − f(g) − f(h) is uniformly bounded and f(g^{n}) = n·f(g).

- The vector space of pseudocharacters of a boundedly generated group G is finite-dimensional.

== Examples ==
- If n ≥ 3, the group SL_{n}(Z) is boundedly generated by its elementary subgroups, formed by matrices differing from the identity matrix only in one off-diagonal entry. In 1984, Carter and Keller gave an elementary proof of this result, motivated by a question in algebraic K-theory.
- A free group on at least two generators is not boundedly generated (see below).
- The group SL_{2}(Z) is not boundedly generated, since it contains a free subgroup with two generators of index 12.
- A Gromov-hyperbolic group is boundedly generated if and only if it is virtually cyclic (or elementary), i.e. contains a cyclic subgroup of finite index.

== Free groups are not boundedly generated ==
Several authors have stated in the mathematical literature that it is obvious that finitely generated free groups are not boundedly generated. This section contains various obvious and less obvious ways of proving this. Some of the methods, which touch on bounded cohomology, are important because they are geometric rather than algebraic, so can be applied to a wider class of groups, for example Gromov-hyperbolic groups.

Since for any n ≥ 2, the free group on 2 generators F_{2} contains the free group on n generators F_{n} as a subgroup of finite index (in fact n − 1), once one non-cyclic free group on finitely many generators is known to be not boundedly generated, this will be true for all of them. Similarly, since SL_{2}(Z) contains F_{2} as a subgroup of index 12, it is enough to consider SL_{2}(Z). In other words, to show that no F_{n} with n ≥ 2 has bounded generation, it is sufficient to prove this for one of them or even just for SL_{2}(Z) .

=== Burnside counterexamples ===
Since bounded generation is preserved under taking homomorphic images, if a single finitely generated group with at least two generators is known to be not boundedly generated, this will be true for the free group on the same number of generators, and hence for all free groups. To show that no (non-cyclic) free group has bounded generation, it is therefore enough to produce one example of a finitely generated group which is not boundedly generated, and any finitely generated infinite torsion group will work. The existence of such groups constitutes Golod and Shafarevich's negative solution of the generalized Burnside problem in 1964; later, other explicit examples of infinite finitely generated torsion groups were constructed by Aleshin, Olshanskii, and Grigorchuk, using automata. Consequently, free groups of rank at least two are not boundedly generated.

=== Symmetric groups ===
The symmetric group S_{n} can be generated by two elements, a 2-cycle and an n-cycle, so that it is a quotient group of F_{2}. On the other hand, it is easy to show that the maximal order M(n) of an element in S_{n} satisfies

log M(n) ≤ n/e

where e is Euler's number (Edmund Landau proved the more precise asymptotic estimate log M(n) ~ (n log n)^{1/2}). In fact if the cycles in a cycle decomposition of a permutation have length N_{1}, ..., N_{k} with N_{1} + ··· + N_{k} = n, then the order of the permutation divides the product N_{1} ··· N_{k}, which in turn is bounded by (n/k)^{k}, using the inequality of arithmetic and geometric means. On the other hand, (n/x)^{x} is maximized when x = e. If F_{2} could be written as a product of m cyclic subgroups, then necessarily n! would have to be less than or equal to M(n)^{m} for all n, contradicting Stirling's asymptotic formula.

=== Hyperbolic geometry ===
There is also a simple geometric proof that G = SL_{2}(Z) is not boundedly generated. It acts by Möbius transformations on the upper half-plane H, with the Poincaré metric. Any compactly supported 1-form α on a fundamental domain of G extends uniquely to a G-invariant 1-form on H. If z is in H and γ is the geodesic from z to g(z), the function defined by

$$F(g)\equiv F_{\alpha,z}(g)=\int_{\gamma}\, \alpha$$

satisfies the first condition for a pseudocharacter since by the Stokes theorem

$$F(gh) - F(g)-F(h) = \int_{\Delta}\, d\alpha,$$

where Δ is the geodesic triangle with vertices z, g(z) and h^{−1}(z), and geodesics triangles have area bounded by π. The homogenized function

$$f_\alpha(g) = \lim_{n\rightarrow \infty} F_{\alpha,z}(g^n)/n$$

defines a pseudocharacter, depending only on α. As is well known from the theory of dynamical systems, any orbit (g^{k}(z)) of a hyperbolic element g has limit set consisting of two fixed points on the extended real axis; it follows that the geodesic segment from z to g(z) cuts through only finitely many translates of the fundamental domain. It is therefore easy to choose α so that f_{α} equals one on a given hyperbolic element and vanishes on a finite set of other hyperbolic elements with distinct fixed points. Since G therefore has an infinite-dimensional space of pseudocharacters, it cannot be boundedly generated.

Dynamical properties of hyperbolic elements can similarly be used to prove that any non-elementary Gromov-hyperbolic group is not boundedly generated.

=== Brooks pseudocharacters ===
Robert Brooks gave a combinatorial scheme to produce pseudocharacters of any free group F_{n}; this scheme was later shown to yield an infinite-dimensional family of pseudocharacters (see Grigorchuk 1994). Epstein and Fujiwara later extended these results to all non-elementary Gromov-hyperbolic groups.

=== Gromov boundary ===
This simple folklore proof uses dynamical properties of the action of hyperbolic elements on the Gromov boundary of a Gromov-hyperbolic group. For the special case of the free group F_{n}, the boundary (or space of ends) can be identified with the space X of semi-infinite reduced words

g_{1} g_{2} ···

in the generators and their inverses. It gives a natural compactification of the tree, given by the Cayley graph with respect to the generators. A sequence of semi-infinite words converges to another such word provided that the initial segments agree after a certain stage, so that X is compact (and metrizable). The free group acts by left multiplication on the semi-infinite words. Moreover, any element g in F_{n} has exactly two fixed points g^{±∞}, namely the reduced infinite words given by the limits of g^{n} as n tends to ±∞. Furthermore, g^{n}·w tends to g^{±∞} as n tends to ±∞ for any semi-infinite word w; and more generally if w_{n} tends to w ≠ g^{±∞}, then g^{n}·w_{n} tends to g^{+∞} as n tends to ∞.

If F_{n} were boundedly generated, it could be written as a product of cyclic groups C_{i} generated by elements h_{i}. Let X_{0} be the countable subset given by the finitely many F_{n}-orbits of the fixed points h_{i}^{±∞}, the fixed points of the h_{i} and all their conjugates. Since X is uncountable, there is an element of g with fixed points outside X_{0} and a point w outside X_{0} different from these fixed points. Then for some subsequence (g_{m}) of (g^{n})

g_{m} = h_{1}^{n(m,1)} ··· h_{k}^{n(m,k)}, with each n(m,i ) constant or strictly monotone.

On the one hand, by successive use of the rules for computing limits of the form h^{n}·w_{n}, the limit of the right hand side applied to x is necessarily a fixed point of one of the conjugates of the h_{i}'s. On the other hand, this limit also must be g^{+∞}, which is not one of these points, a contradiction.
