= Serre's conjecture =

Serre's conjecture may refer to:

- Quillen–Suslin theorem, formerly known as Serre's conjecture
- Serre's conjecture II, concerning the Galois cohomology of linear algebraic groups
- Serre's modularity conjecture, concerning Galois representations
- Serre's multiplicity conjectures in commutative algebra
- Ribet's theorem, formerly known as Serre's epsilon conjecture

== See also ==
- Jean-Pierre Serre
