= Center for Life Detection =

Institute dedicated to the scientific search of extraterrestrial life

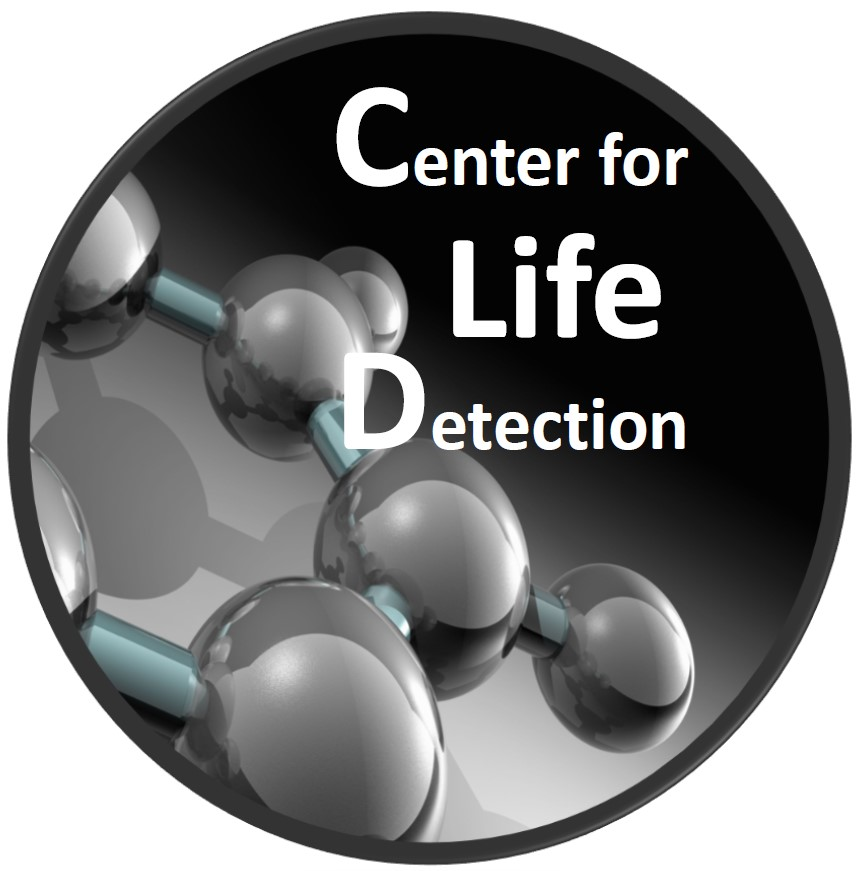
- Abbreviation: CLD
- Formation: February 11, 2019; 7 years ago
- Type: Abiogenesis and astrobiology research
- Legal status: Active
- Headquarters: NASA's Ames Research Center
- Location: Moffett Federal Airfield in California, USA
- Key people: Tori Hoehler, Andrew Pohorille, Richard Quinn
- Parent organization: NASA
- Website: www.nasa.gov/ames/cld

The Center for Life Detection (CLD) is a collaboration among scientists and technologists from NASA’s Ames Research Center and Goddard Spaceflight Center, which formed in 2018 to support the planning and implementation of missions that will seek evidence of life beyond Earth. CLD is supported by NASA’s Planetary Science Division and is one of three core teams in the Network for Life Detection. CLD’s perspectives on life detection science and technology development are summarized in “Groundwork for Life Detection”, a white paper submitted to and cited in the 2023-2032 Planetary Science and Astrobiology Decadal Survey.

== Activities ==
The search for life elsewhere is among the NASA Science Mission Directorate's high-level priorities (Science 2020-2024: A Vision for Scientific Excellence, Priority 1). The Center for Life Detection was founded to support this search by:

- conducting research on biosignature “detectability” to help inform target/sample selection and measurement strategies/requirements;
- developing tools and engagement activities that enable members of the broader astrobiology community to formulate their knowledge, research, and expertise in a way that facilitates use in mission planning;
- supporting the instrument development community in mapping existing and emerging measurement technology to life detection science objectives, in order to establish science traceability and identify technology development needs.

== Research ==
Multiple worlds within and beyond the Solar System are considered potentially habitable by virtue of the presence of liquid water, and mission concepts to seek evidence of life on these worlds are being developed. On Earth, the abundance distribution of life and its products ranges over many orders of magnitude, as a function of multiple environmental and ecological factors. Similar variability can be expected both within and among inhabited worlds beyond Earth, if any exist, and understanding it can inform target selection, observing strategies, and measurement requirements for missions that seek evidence of life. To build this understanding, scientists in CLD conduct research to assess how environmental factors affect “detectability” – the extent to which life, if present, would express itself in characteristic, observable features. This research is responsive to a recommendation in the National Academies Consensus Report on Astrobiology Strategy (NASEM ABS): “Detectability: NASA should support expanding biosignature research to address gaps in understanding biosignature preservation and the breadth of possible false positives and false negative signatures”. The research is conducted with applications to Mars, Ocean Worlds, and Exoplanets.

== The Life Detection Forum Project ==
The astrobiology knowledge that will be required for life detection mission concept development and science definition is diverse, often taking forms that do not map clearly to mission design, and diffuse, in that it is spread across many scientific disciplines and a wide-ranging literature. The Life Detection Forum (LDF) project seeks to develop a ‘living’, community-driven suite of tools to centralize the requisite body of knowledge and organize it in a way that streamlines its use in program planning, mission concept development, and interpretation of findings. Researchers in CLD work actively to engage a diverse range of communities in the use of this tool in order to harness expertise that is not well represented in the traditional sphere of space science.

The LDF is being built as a web-based platform that can be populated and continually updated by a broad user base, in order to track the evolving state of knowledge regarding life detection science and technology. The core module of the system, released in early 2021, is the Life Detection Knowledge Base (LDKB). LDKB is a system for organizing user-provided knowledge about objects, patterns, or processes that might serve as evidence for life according to its bearing on the potential for false positive or false negative results. A technology-oriented counterpart to LDKB, the Measurement Technology Module (MTM) is currently in development. MTM will house user-contributed information regarding current and emerging technologies that could be used to support life detection objectives. When combined, LDKB and MTM will provide a basis for establishing science traceability and identifying technology development needs.

The Life Detection Forum Project is responsive to the NASEM ABS recommendation: “NASA should aid the community in developing a comprehensive framework [...] to guide testing and evaluation of in situ and remote biosignatures.

== Workshops ==
CLD sought extensive community involvement in the development of LDF tools and early stages of LDKB content development, through a series of workshops and hands-on community engagement activities.

- Introduction to the Life Detection Forum Project (Summer 2019)
  - Special session, approx. 130 participants
  - Introduction to, and feedback on, the LDF concept and a basic working model
- Criteria for Life Detection Measurements (Fall 2020)
  - Two community workshops, 60+ participants
  - Establish & vet the evaluative organizing basis for LDKB
- The Life Detection Knowledge Base (January 2021)
  - Rollout of LDKB at a community workshop of > 150 participants
- LDKB Content Development Groups (Spring-Fall 2021)
  - CLD-facilitated, community-based user groups (100+ participants, active 6–8 months)
  - Content provision in 5 theme areas, beta testing of LDKB, build & train user base
- Future of the Search for Life (Spring 2022)
  - 2-weeks workshop, 100 participants
  - Engage scientists and technologists to discuss high-priority approaches to life detection, define measurement requirements, and identify corresponding measurement technology gaps
