= Andrew Pohorille =

Polish-American astrobiologist (1949–2024)

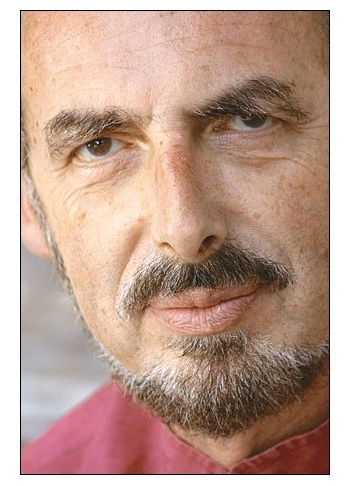
- Born: May 14, 1949; Szczecin, Poland
- Died: January 6, 2024 (aged 74); Palo Alto, California, US
- Education: University of Warsaw
- Awards: NASA Exceptional Scientific Achievement Medal; NASA Exceptional Service Medal
- Scientific career
- Institutions: University of California, Berkeley; UCSF; NASA Ames Research Center
- Doctoral advisor: David Shugar
- Other academic advisors: Bernard Pullman

Andrzej (Andrew) Pohorille (May 14, 1949 – January 6, 2024) was a Polish-American astrobiologist, biophysicist, and quantum chemist who worked mostly at the NASA-Ames Research Center and University of California, San Francisco. He was a leading scientist on the origin of life and biosignature detection at NASA. His work proposed that proteins may have been the first molecules to support life, challenging RNA-first theories of abiogenesis.

== Education and career ==
Pohorille was the only child of Eugenia Gartenberg, a teacher, and Maksymilian Pohorille, a professor of economics at SGH Warsaw School of Economics. He moved to the US at the age of six and later studied physics at the University of Warsaw, where he eventually obtained his Ph.D. in theoretical physics and structural biology under the supervision of David Shugar. He went on to conduct postdoctoral research at the Institut de biologie physico-chimique in Paris, where he worked in the group of Bernard Pullman. He became an assistant professor at the University of California, Berkeley in 1988, where he worked until 1992. He moved to the University of California, San Francisco in the same year as a professor at the Department of Pharmaceutical Chemistry.

In 1996, Pohorille joined the NASA Ames Research Center, where he was a principal investigator and head of the NASA Center for Computational Astrobiology. He maintained his position at University of California, San Francisco. At NASA, Pohorille conceived and led the development of the Life Detection Knowledge Base (LDKB), a community web tool that assists the detection of the evidence of life beyond Earth. He also was a leading figure in the establishment of the NASA Center for Life Detection, where he later became a co-director.

In 2002, Pohorille received the NASA Exceptional Scientific Achievement Medal. In 2010, he received the H. Julian Allen Award. In 2005, he became the Distinguished Lecturer at the Centre for Mathematical Modeling and the National Space Research Centre in the U.K.. In 2008, he was the Maxwell Colloquium speaker at the University of Edinburgh.

== Personal life ==
Pohorille's parents were the only members of their families who survived the Holocaust. Pohorille was married to Joanna Sokołowska, whom he met at a conference and is also his working partner.

== See also ==
- Mary Voytek
- Center for Life Detection
