= Serre group =

Pro-algebraic group

In mathematics, the Serre group S is the pro-algebraic group whose representations correspond to CM-motives over the algebraic closure of the rationals, or to polarizable rational Hodge structures with abelian Mumford–Tate groups. It is a projective limit of finite dimensional tori, so in particular is abelian. It was introduced by Serre (1968). It is a subgroup of the Taniyama group.

There are two different but related groups called the Serre group, one the connected component of the identity in the other. This article is mainly about the connected group, usually called the Serre group but sometimes called the connected Serre group. In addition one can define Serre groups of algebraic number fields, and the Serre group is the inverse limit of the Serre groups of number fields.

== Definition ==
The Serre group is the projective limit of the Serre groups of S_{L} of finite Galois extensions of the rationals, and each of these groups S_{L} is a torus, so is determined by its module of characters, a finite free Z-module with an action of the finite Galois group Gal(L/Q). If L* is the algebraic group with L*(A) the units of A⊗L, then L* is a torus with the same dimension as L, and its characters can be identified with integral functions on Gal(L/Q). The Serre group S_{L} is a quotient of this torus L*, so can be described explicitly in terms of the module X*(S_{L}) of rational characters. This module of rational characters can be identified with the integral functions λ on Gal(L/Q) such that

(σ−1)(ι+1)λ = (ι+1)(σ−1)λ = 0

for all σ in Gal(L/Q), where ι is complex conjugation. It is acted on by the Galois group.

The full Serre group S can be described similarly in terms of its module X*(S) of rational characters. This module of rational characters can be identified with the locally constant integral functions λ on Gal(Q̅/Q) such that

(σ−1)(ι+1)λ = (ι+1)(σ−1)λ = 0

for all σ in Gal(Q̅/Q), where ι is complex conjugation.
