= Claudine Monteil =

French writer, women's rights specialist, historian and diplomat

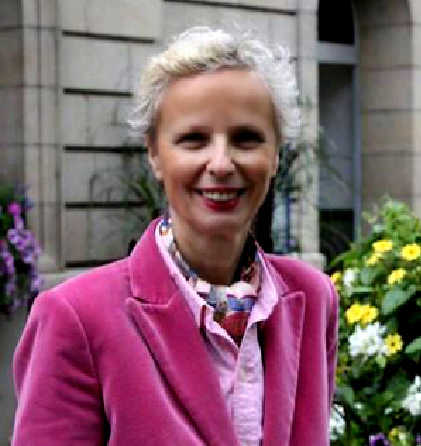
- Claudine Monteil in 2012
- Born: Claudine Serre; 28 November 1949 (age 76); Paris, France
- Occupation: Writer • Historian • Diplomat
- Parent(s): Jean-Pierre Serre; Josiane Serre

Claudine Monteil (born 1949) is a French writer, women's rights specialist, historian, and a former French diplomat.

== Early life and education ==
Monteil's mother, Josiane Serre, was a pioneer of French quantum chemistry and the director of the École normale supérieure de jeunes filles. Her father is Fields Medal and Abel Prize winning mathematician Jean-Pierre Serre. Monteil holds a Ph.D. on the study of Simone de Beauvoir's writings and life.

== Career ==
Monteil is one of the founders of the French women's rights movement in 1970 and one of the signatories of the Manifesto of the 343. She authored several works on Simone de Beauvoir. While working on women's rights, she was a long close friend of Beauvoir, Jean-Paul Sartre, and Beauvoir's sister, the painter Hélène de Beauvoir. Her writings on the Beauvoirs, Sartre, and French feminism have been translated into multiple languages.

Claudine Monteil has been a retired French diplomat since the end of 2014. She has been working at the French Ministry of Foreign Affairs on different issues, including the relations between France and institutions of the United Nations as, among others, UNICEF, UNFPA, and UNESCO. In 2016, she published the first biography on Ève Curie, youngest daughter of Pierre and Marie Curie, who was a hero of World War II.

== Bibliography ==
- Simone de Beauvoir, modernité et engagement éditions L'Harmattan, "Simone de Beauvoir, modern and committed"
- Simone de Beauvoir, côté femme, Timée-éditions (English: Simone de Beauvoir, her story as a woman) - translated into Chinese and Japanese
- Les Sœurs Beauvoir (English: The Beauvoir Sisters) - translated in English, Korean, Spanish, German, Chinese and Italian.
- Les Amants de la liberté, Sartre et Beauvoir dans le siècle (English: The Lovers of Freedom, Sartre and Beauvoir in the Century) - translated into Greek, Portuguese, Swedish, Japanese, Chinese, Romanian and Turkish
- Simone de Beauvoir le mouvement des femmes, mémoires d'une jeune fille rebelle (English: Simone de Beauvoir the women's movement, memories of a girl rebel) - translated into Japanese and Swedish.
- Les Amants des Temps Modernes, Oona et Charles Chaplin (English: Lovers of Modern Times: Oona and Charles Chaplin) - translated into Greek and Portuguese.
- Simone de Beauvoir, modernité et engagement ("Simone de Beauvoir, modernity and commitment") éditions L'Harmattan, Paris, 2009.
- Complots mathématiques à Princeton ("Mathematical plots in Princeton") Odile Jacob publishing house,(thriller), Paris,2010.
- Simone de Beauvoir et les femmes aujourd'hui (by-line, "Simone de Beauvoir and women today") Editions Odile Jacob, Paris 2011
- Eve Curie, l'autre fille de Pierre et Marie Curie (by-line "Eve Curie, the other daughter of Pierre and Marie Curie"), Editions Odile Jacob, 2016
