= Denis Serre =

French mathematician (born 1954)

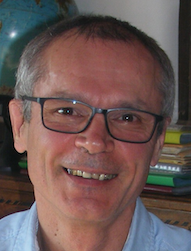
Denis Serre

Denis Serre (born 1 November 1954) is a French mathematician who works as a professor at the École normale supérieure de Lyon, where he has chaired the mathematics department since 2012. His research concerns partial differential equations, hydrodynamics, and conservation laws.

== Education and career ==
Serre was born in Nancy, France; he is the nephew of mathematician Jean-Pierre Serre. He obtained his agrégation in 1977, and his doctorat de troisième cycle in 1978, before finishing a D.Sc. in 1982 from the University of Paris-Sud under the supervision of Roger Temam. He worked as a student teacher at the ENS de St-Cloud (a precursor institution to the ENS de Lyon) from 1974 to 1978, at the Centre national de la recherche scientifique in Orsay from 1978 to 1983, and at the University of St. Etienne from 1983 to 1987, before returning to the ENS de Lyon in 1987.

== Publications ==
Serre is the author of several books, including

- Systems of Conservation Laws (2 vols., Cambridge University Press, 1999 & 2000).
- Matrices: Theory and Applications (Springer, Graduate Texts in Mathematics 216, 2002; 2nd ed., 2010).
- Multidimensional Hyperbolic Partial Differential Equations: First-Order Systems and Applications (with Sylvie Benzoni-Gavage, Oxford University Press, 2007). ISBN 9780199211234

== Awards and honors ==
From 1992 to 1997 Serre was a junior member of the Institut Universitaire de France. He became a knight of the Ordre des Palmes Académiques in 2012. In 2014, he was elected as a fellow of the American Mathematical Society "for contributions to hyperbolic conservation laws and mathematical exposition." On November 7–9, 2014, a conference on conservation laws was held in honor of his 60th birthday. He received the Blaise Pascal Prize in 1990, the Institut Henri Poincaré Prize in 2000 and the Jacques-Louis Lions Prize of the Académie des Sciences in 2017.
