= Serre's property FA =

Property of algebraic groups

In mathematics, Property FA is a property of groups first defined by Jean-Pierre Serre.

A group G is said to have property FA if every action of G on a tree has a global fixed point.

Serre shows that if a group has property FA, then it cannot split as an amalgamated product or HNN extension; indeed, if G is contained in an amalgamated product then it is contained in one of the factors. In particular, a finitely generated group with property FA has finite abelianization.

Property FA is equivalent for countable G to the three properties: G is not an amalgamated product; G does not have Z as a quotient group; G is finitely generated. For general groups G the third condition may be replaced by requiring that G not be the union of a strictly increasing sequence of subgroup.

Examples of groups with property FA include SL_{3}(Z) and more generally G(Z) where G is a simply-connected simple Chevalley group of rank at least 2. The group SL_{2}(Z) is an exception, since it is isomorphic to the amalgamated product of the cyclic groups C_{4} and C_{6} along C_{2}.

Any quotient group of a group with property FA has property FA. If some subgroup of finite index in G has property FA then so does G, but the converse does not hold in general. If N is a normal subgroup of G and both N and G/N have property FA, then so does G.

It is a theorem of Watatani that Kazhdan's property (T) implies property FA, but not conversely. Indeed, any subgroup of finite index in a T-group has property FA.

== Examples ==
The following groups have property FA:

- A finitely generated torsion group;
- SL_{3}(Z);
- The Schwarz group $\left\langle{ a,b : a^A = b^B = (ab)^C = 1 }\right\rangle$ for integers A,B,C ≥ 2;
- SL_{2}(R) where R is the ring of integers of an algebraic number field which is not Q or an imaginary quadratic field.

The following groups do not have property FA:

- SL_{2}(Z);
- SL_{2}(R_{D}) where R_{D} is the ring of integers of an imaginary quadratic field of discriminant not −3 or −4.
