= Yutaka Taniyama =

Japanese mathematician

- 谷山 豊
- Born: 12 November 1927; Kisai, Saitama, Japan
- Died: 17 November 1958 (aged 31); Ikebukuro, Toshima, Tokyo, Japan
- Education: University of Tokyo
- Known for: Contributions in algebraic number theory Taniyama–Shimura conjecture Taniyama group Taniyama's problems
- Scientific career
- Fields: Mathematics
- Workplaces: University of Tokyo

Yutaka Taniyama (谷山 豊, Taniyama Yutaka; 12 November 1927 – 17 November 1958) was a Japanese mathematician known for the Taniyama–Shimura conjecture.

== Life ==
Taniyama was born on 12 November 1927 in Kisai, a town in Saitama. He was the sixth of eight children born to a doctor's family. He studied at Urawa High School (present-day Saitama University) after graduating from Fudouoka Middle School. He suspended his college for two years due to a medical condition, but finally graduated in 1950. During Taniyama's college years, he aspired to be a mathematician after reading Teiji Takagi's work.

In 1958, Taniyama worked as an Associate Professor after years of assistant at the University of Tokyo. He also obtained his doctorate from the University in May. In October, Taniyama was engaged to be married to Misako Suzuki (鈴木美佐子, Suzuki Misako), while the Institute for Advanced Study in Princeton, New Jersey offered him a position.

On 17 November 1958, Taniyama committed suicide by poisoning himself with gas. He left a note explaining how far he had progressed with his teaching duties, and apologizing to his colleagues for the trouble he was causing them. The first paragraph of his suicide note read (quoted in Shimura, 1989):

Until yesterday I had no definite intention of killing myself. But more than a few must have noticed that lately I have been tired both physically and mentally. As to the cause of my suicide, I don't quite understand it myself, but it is not the result of a particular incident, nor of a specific matter. Merely may I say, I am in the frame of mind that I lost confidence in my future. There may be someone to whom my suicide will be troubling or a blow to a certain degree. I sincerely hope that this incident will cast no dark shadow over the future of that person. At any rate, I cannot deny that this is a kind of betrayal, but please excuse it as my last act in my own way, as I have been doing my own way all my life.

Although his note is mostly enigmatic it does mention tiredness and a loss of confidence in his future. Taniyama's ideas had been criticized as unsubstantiated and his behavior had occasionally been deemed peculiar. Goro Shimura mentioned that he suffered from depression.

About a month later, Suzuki also committed suicide by gas, leaving a note reading: "We promised each other that no matter where we went, we would never be separated. Now that he is gone, I must go too in order to join him."

After Taniyama's death, Goro Shimura wrote:

To conclude this article, I may ask somewhat rhetorically: Who was Yutaka Taniyama? This is not asked about his stature in the history of mathematics. My concern here is what his existence meant to his generation and especially to me. What I have written may naturally be viewed as a lengthy answer to that question, but to sum up, I should state more clearly one point to which my writing so far has only vaguely alluded: that he was the moral support of many of those who came into mathematical contact with him, including of course myself. Probably he was never conscious of this role he was playing. But I feel his noble generosity in this respect even more strongly now than when he was alive. And yet nobody was able to give him any support when he desperately needed it. Reflecting on this, I am overwhelmed by the bitterest grief.

== Contribution ==
Taniyama was best known for conjecturing, in modern language, automorphic properties of L-functions of elliptic curves over any number field. A partial and refined case of this conjecture for elliptic curves over rationals is called the Taniyama–Shimura conjecture or the modularity theorem whose statement he subsequently refined in collaboration with Goro Shimura. The names Taniyama, Shimura and Weil have all been attached to this conjecture, but the idea is essentially due to Taniyama.

Taniyama's interests were in algebraic number theory. His work has been influenced by André Weil, who had met Taniyama during the symposiums on algebraic number theory in 1955, in which he became famous after proposing his problems at it.

Taniyama's problems proposed in 1955 form the basis of a Taniyama–Shimura conjecture, that "every elliptic curve defined over the rational field is a factor of the Jacobian of a modular function field". In 1986, Ken Ribet proved that if the Taniyama–Shimura conjecture held, then so would Fermat's Last Theorem, which inspired Andrew Wiles to work for a number of years in secrecy on it, and to prove enough of it to prove Fermat's Last Theorem. Owing to the pioneering contribution of Wiles and the efforts of a number of mathematicians, the Taniyama–Shimura conjecture was finally proven in 1999. The original Taniyama conjecture for elliptic curves over arbitrary number fields remains open.

Goro Shimura stated:

Taniyama was not a very careful person as a mathematician. He made a lot of mistakes. But he made mistakes in a good direction and so eventually he got right answers. I tried to imitate him, but I found out that it is very difficult to make good mistakes.

== See also ==
- Taniyama group
- Taniyama's problems

== Publications ==
- Shimura, Goro; Taniyama, Yutaka (1961), Complex multiplication of abelian varieties and its applications to number theory, Publications of the Mathematical Society of Japan, vol. 6, Tokyo: The Mathematical Society of Japan, MR 0125113 This book is hard to find, but an expanded version was later published as Shimura, Goro (1997). Abelian Varieties with Complex Multiplication and Modular Functions (Hardcover ed.). Princeton University Press. ISBN 978-0-691-01656-6.
