= Alp Eden =

Turkish mathematician (born 1958)

Osman Alp Eden (born 1958) is a Turkish mathematician, scientist and professor of mathematics. He is a retired member of the Boğaziçi University Mathematics Department in Istanbul, Turkey.

== Education ==
Alp Eden was born in Istanbul in 1958. He finished the high school Robert College of Istanbul in 1976. He graduated from Boğaziçi University Civil Engineering and Mathematics departments in 1981. He received his PhD in Mathematics under the supervision of Ciprian Ilie Foiaș at the Indiana University Bloomington in the United States in 1989.

== Academic career ==
He worked in Arizona State University in 1989–1992. Then he became a full time member of the Department of Mathematics, at Boğaziçi University, Istanbul. In years he served as the chair of the department and the vice-dean of the Faculty of Arts and Sciences. He retired in 2015 and moved to İzmir. He is one of the founders of the Masters program in Financial Engineering at Boğaziçi University. Between 2006-2016 he was a member of the Steering Committee of the Istanbul Center for Mathematical Sciences (IMBM). He served as the Chief Editor of the Turkish Journal of Mathematics. After retirement he served as the Editor of the popular mathematics journal Matematik Dünyası published by the Turkish Mathematical Society (TMD).

He has been an active researcher, having published more than 50 scientific manuscripts with more than 600 citations. In 1995 he was awarded the Science Award for Young Scientists given by the Scientific and Technological Research Council of Turkey (TUBITAK). He was awarded the Boğaziçi University Award for Excellence in Research in 1998 (for young scientists) and again in 2009. A one-day PDE workshop was held in his honor in 2015 by TMD. There is a conjecture in the field of dynamical systems named after Alp Eden.

== Research areas ==
His research interests include non-linear PDEs, dynamical systems, finance mathematics and mathematical modelling.

=== Representative scientific publications ===
- Book: Eden, A.; Foias, C.; Nicolaenko, B.; Temam, R. Exponential attractors for dissipative evolution equations. RAM: Research in Applied Mathematics, 37. Masson, Paris; John Wiley & Sons, Ltd., Chichester, 1994.
- Eden, A.; Kalantarov, V. K. The convective Cahn-Hilliard equation. Appl. Math. Lett. 20 (2007), no. 4, 455–461.
- Eden, A.; Milani, A. J. "Exponential attractors for extensible beam equations". Nonlinearity 6 (1993), no. 3, 457–479.
- Eden, A.; Milani, A. J.; Nicolaenko, B. Finite-dimensional exponential attractors for semilinear wave equations with damping. J. Math. Anal. Appl. 169 (1992), no. 2, 408–419.
- Eden, A.; Michaux, B.; Rakotoson, J.-M. Doubly nonlinear parabolic-type equations as dynamical systems. J. Dynam. Differential Equations 3 (1991), no. 1, 87–131.
