= Bernard Pullman =

French chemist (1919–1996)

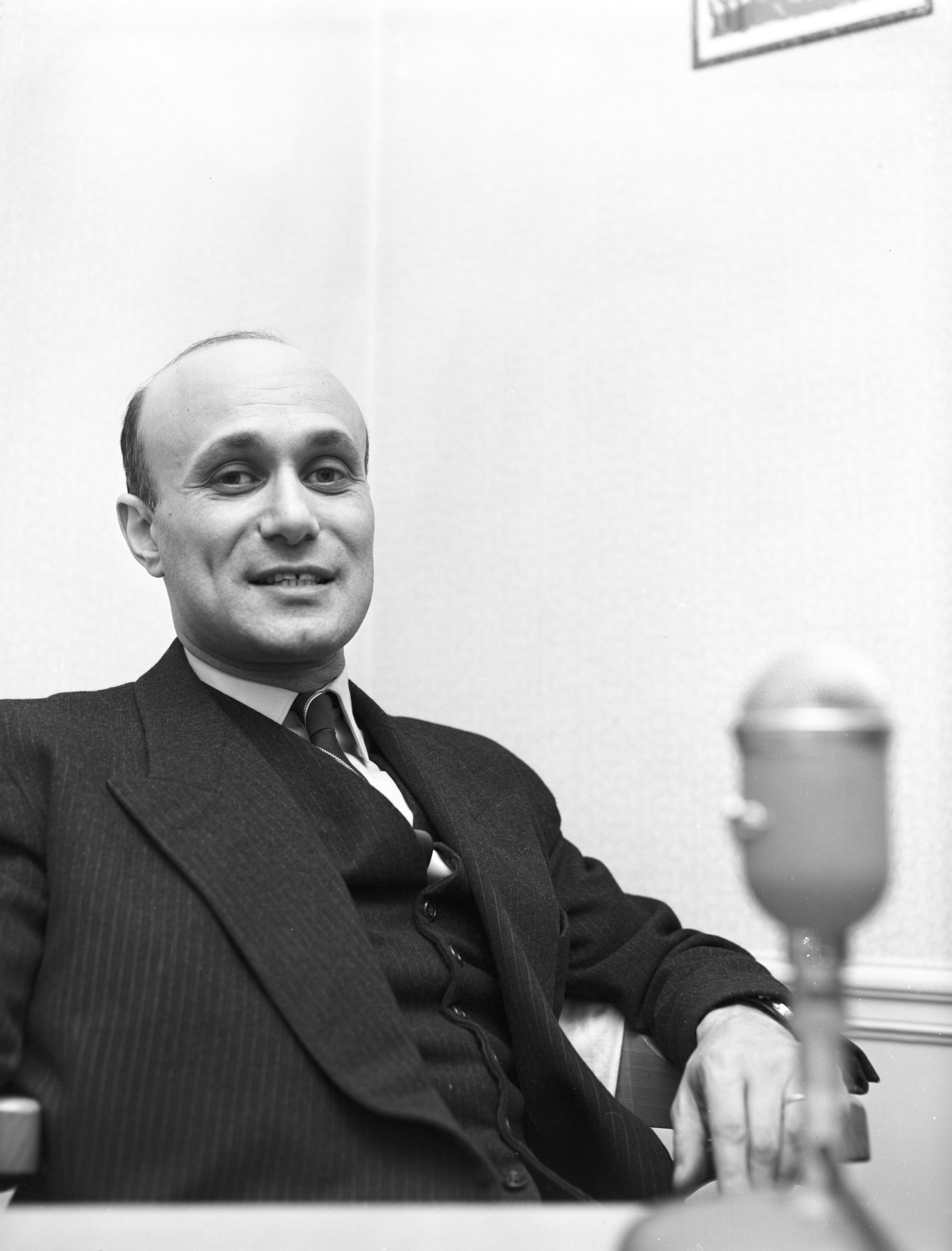
- Born: 19 March 1919; Włocławek, Poland
- Died: 9 June 1996 (aged 77)
- Citizenship: French
- Education: Sorbonne
- Spouse: Alberte Pullman
- Scientific career
- Fields: Quantum biochemistry
- Institutions: CNRS, Sorbonne
- Thesis: (1948)
- Notable students: Andrew Pohorille

Bernard Pullman (19 March 1919 – 9 June 1996) was a French theoretical quantum chemist and quantum biochemist.

== Life ==
Pullman was born on 19 March 1919 in Włocławek, Poland. He studied at the Sorbonne, then spent the Second World War as a French Army officer in Africa and the Middle East. Returning to Paris in 1946, he completed his licence ès sciences in 1946 and the Docteur-es-Science in 1948. From 1946 to 1954, he worked at the Centre National de la Recherche Scientifique (CNRS). In 1954 he was appointed Professor at the Sorbonne. In 1959, he became Director of the Department of Quantum Biochemistry at the Institut de biologie physico-chimique. In 1963, he was promoted to Director of the Institute. He was a founding member of the International Academy of Quantum Molecular Science.

Over the course of his career, Pullman published about 400 scientific papers and 5 books, three with his wife Alberte Pullman, his lifelong collaborator. In joint work published in the 1950s and 1960s, they founded the new field of quantum biochemistry. They also pioneered the application of quantum chemistry to predicting the carcinogenic properties of aromatic hydrocarbons.

After his 1989 retirement, he wrote The Atom in the History of Human Thought (Paris: Fayard, 1995), a work approachable by general readers.

== Books by Pullman ==
- 1963 (with Alberte Pullman). Quantum Biochemistry. New York: John Wiley Interscience. ISBN 978-0-470-70231-4 ; ISBN 0-470-70231-1.
- 1965 (with M. Weissbluth). Molecular Biophysics. New York: Academic Press, New York.
- 1998. The Atom in the History of Human Thought, trans. by Axel Reisinger. Oxford Univ. Press.
