= Semi-infinite =

In mathematics, semi-infinite objects are objects which are infinite or unbounded in some but not all possible ways.

== In ordered structures and Euclidean spaces ==
Generally, a semi-infinite set is bounded in one direction, and unbounded in another. For instance, the natural numbers are semi-infinite considered as a subset of the integers; similarly, the intervals $(c,\infty)$ and $(-\infty,c)$ and their closed counterparts are semi-infinite subsets of $\R$ if $c$ is finite. Half-spaces and half-lines are sometimes described as semi-infinite regions.

Semi-infinite regions occur frequently in the study of differential equations. For instance, one might study solutions of the heat equation in an idealised semi-infinite metal bar.

A semi-infinite integral is an improper integral over a semi-infinite interval. More generally, objects indexed or parametrised by semi-infinite sets may be described as semi-infinite.

Most forms of semi-infiniteness are boundedness properties, not cardinality or measure properties: semi-infinite sets are typically infinite in cardinality and measure.

== In optimization ==
Many optimization problems involve some set of variables and some set of constraints. A problem is called semi-infinite if one (but not both) of these sets is finite. The study of such problems is known as semi-infinite programming.
