= Alberte Pullman =

French chemist (1920–2011)

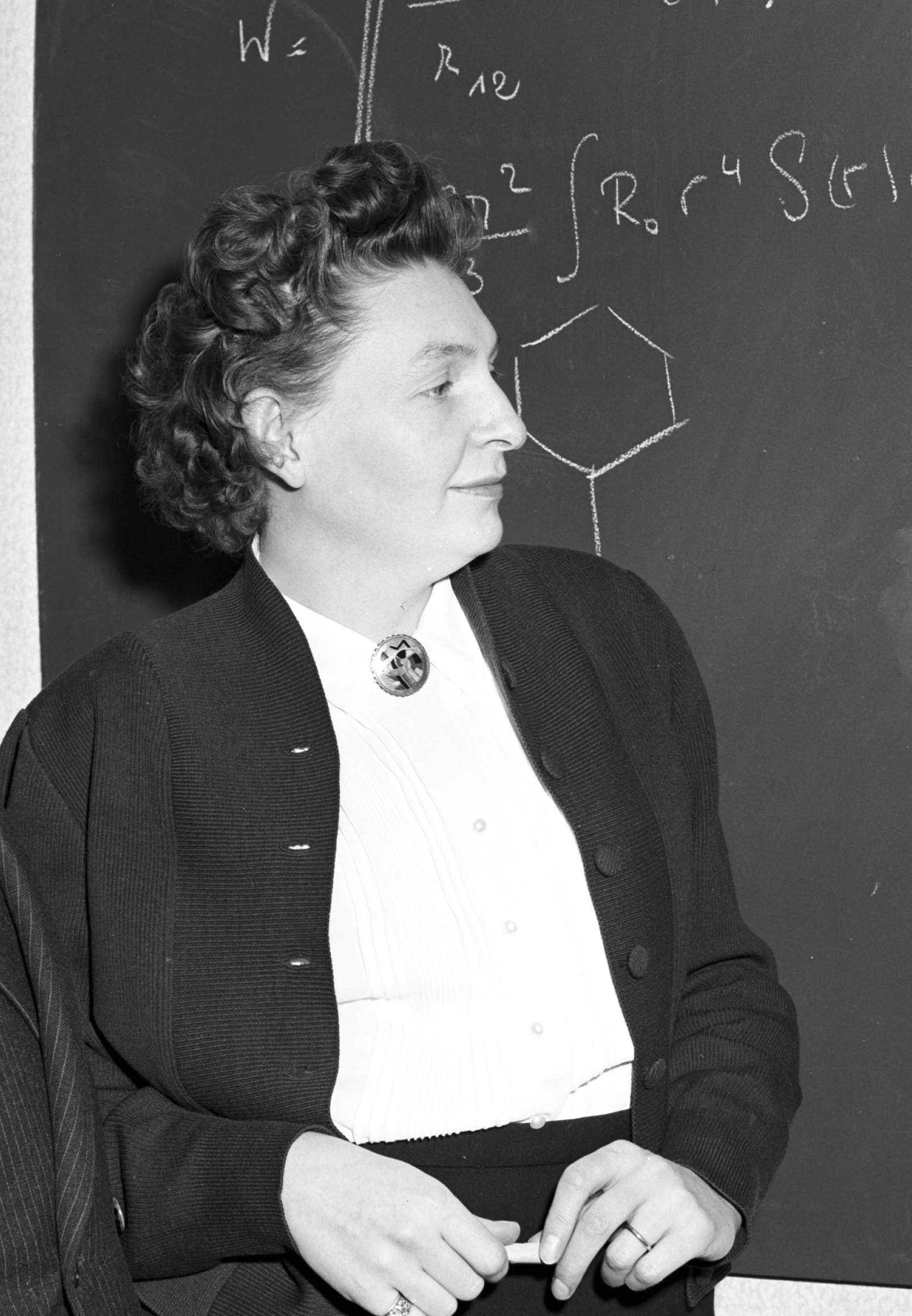
- Born: Alberte Bucher; 26 August 1920; Nantes, France
- Died: 7 January 2011 (aged 90); 14th arrondissement of Paris
- Education: Sorbonne
- Spouse: Bernard Pullman
- Scientific career
- Fields: Quantum biochemistry
- Institutions: CNRS
- Thesis: Contribution à l’étude de la structure électronique des molécules organiques. Etude particulière des Hydrocarbures cancérigènes (1946)

Alberte Pullman (née Bucher, 26 August 1920 – 7 January 2011) was a French theoretical and quantum chemist. She is remembered for her early investigations into the electronic properties of carcinogenic aromatic hydrocarbons, which she later developed with her husband Bernard Pullman.

In early 2026, Pullman was confirmed to be one of the 72 women to have their names added to those of the men already engraved on the Eiffel Tower.

== Early life and education ==
Alberte Bucher was born on 26 August 1920 in Nantes, France. She studied at the Sorbonne starting in 1938. During her studies she worked on calculations at Centre National de la Recherche Scientifique (CNRS). From 1943 she worked with Raymond Daudel, who had been Marie Curie's assistant. She completed her doctorate in 1946, with a 1946 thesis titled "The relation between the electronic structure and the carcinogenic properties of aromatic hydrocarbons" (French: Contribution à l’étude de la structure électronique des molécules organiques. Etude particulière des Hydrocarbures cancérigènes).

== Career ==
Bucher was in Paris during World War II and worked on theoretical chemistry, applying her findings to the study of biomolecules and pharmacology, particularly the carcinogenic properties of aromatic compounds.

Alberte Bucher married fellow scientist Bernard Pullman following his return from war service in 1946, and took his surname. Her findings in the early 1940s strongly influenced his work. She and her husband worked together until his death in 1996. Together they wrote several books including Quantum Biochemistry, Interscience Publishers, 1963. Their work in the 1950s and 1960s was the beginning of the new field of quantum biochemistry. They pioneered the application of quantum chemistry to predicting the carcinogenic properties of aromatic hydrocarbons.

She and her husband took an early interest in problems with cancer, both attending the meeting of the International Union Against Cancer in October 1953 in London.

In this connection, together with her husband, she was an active participant in the series of Sanibel Symposia held in Florida. They also both attended the Jerusalem Symposia on Quantum Chemistry and Biochemistry, which Bernard Pullman had inaugurated in 1967, and the Symposia at the Pontifical Academy of Sciences. Together they are recognized for creating the field of quantum biochemistry.

In 1968, at the International Symposium on Atomic, Molecular, and Solid-State Theory, also known as the Sanibel Symposium, Alberte Pullman presented recent developments in quantum biochemistry. A pioneer in what was then a new field of research, she stressed the importance of intermolecular forces in connection with the recognition process, explaining how and whether molecules could fit together. She reported on the results she had obtained on pairings of nitrogen bases in the DNA molecule in living cells as opposed to those in crystallized materials.

Alberte Pullman also developed the supermolecule technique in connection with hydrogen bonding, molecular hydration and cation binding. Her theoretical studies included examination of the transfer of ions through biological membranes.

She was a member of the International Academy of Quantum Molecular Science and a member of The International Society of Quantum Biology and Pharmacology which she headed from 1979 to 1980.

Pullman was Honorary Director of the Theoretical Biochemistry Department, Institut de Biologie Physico-Chimique, and Directeur de Recherche Emerite at CNRS.

Pullman died aged 90 on 7 January 2011 in the 14e arrondissement of Paris.

== Honours and awards ==
Pullman was nominated four times for the Nobel Prize in Chemistry.

In 1956, together with her husband, she was awarded the Prix Essec du Cancer (Cancer Essec Award) with congratulations from the CNRS director Gilles Dupouy.

In 1968, she received from the French Academy of Sciences the CEA prize (Prix du Commisariat à l'Énergie atomique) for dedicating her career to applications of theoretical chemistry to biology.

Pullman was made an officier of the Legion of Honour in 1989, and promoted to commandeur in 1994.

In 2026, Pullman was announced as one of 72 historical women in STEM whose names were proposed to be added to the 72 men already celebrated on the Eiffel Tower. The plan was conceived by a student and tour guide named Bernard Rigaud and it was announced by the Mayor of Paris, Anne Hidalgo following the recommendations of a committee led by Isabelle Vauglin of Femmes et Sciences and Jean-François Martins, representing the operating company which runs the Eiffel Tower.

== Publications ==
Alberte Pullman authored some 350 publications, including three textbooks together with her husband and many reviews.

Published together with her husband in 1963, "Quantum Biochemistry" received critical praise from George Karreman in 1985 of the University of Chicago. Charles Perrin published a book review in 1964. After summarising the attention given to the Linear Combination of Atomic Orbital Molecular Orbital method in the first part of the book, he highlighted the hundred pages in the second part which present the results of these applications to the electronic structure of vitally significant biochemicals. The book's third part covers electronic aspects of enzymatic reactions, including the dipositive bond in enzymatic hydrolysis. With its extensive appendix of the results of quantum mechanical calculations of compounds of biochemical importance, the well-referenced book was recommended to all those interested in the new field it covers.

Alberte Pullman’s research was affiliated with the Institut de Biologie Physico-Chimique, French National Centre for Scientific Research and other places. Researchgate records 164 publications by Alberte Pullman.

- Transport Through Membranes: Carriers, Channels and Pumps: Proceedings of the Twenty-First Jerusalem Symposium on Quantum Chemistry and Biochemistry Held in Jerusalem, Israel, May 16–19, 1988.
- Model quantum-chemical studies on the reaction between the candidate proximate carcinogen benzo(a)pyrene-7,8-dihydrodiol-9,10-epoxide and guanine.
- SCF ab initio study of the “through‐water” versus “direct” binding of the Na+ and Mg2+ cations to the phosphate anion.
- Electrostatic effect of the macromolecular structure on the biochemical reactivity of the nucleic acids. Significance for chemical carcinogenesis.
- Cation-Ionophore Interactions: Quantification of the Factors Underlying Selective Complexation by Means of Theoretical Computations.
