= David Shugar =

Polish physicist (1915–2015)

- Born: 10 September 1915; Opatów, Poland
- Died: 31 October 2015 (aged 100)
- Spouse(s): Grace Wales Shugar (1918–2013); m. 1943

Academic background
- Education: McGill University

Academic work
- Institutions: Pasteur Institute; Free University of Brussels; University of Warsaw
- Doctoral students: Andrzej Pohorille

David Shugar (10 September 1915 – 31 October 2015) was a professor of the University of Warsaw.

After the First World War, he settled as a child with his parents in Canada. In 1936 he concluded his education of physics at McGill University in Montreal and obtained his doctorate in 1940. Since January 1941, he did research in biophysics in the laboratory of Research Enterprises, Limited, a Crown Company in Leaside near Toronto, later served in the Canadian Marines with the rank of Electrical Sub-Lieutenant R.C.N.V.R. In 1946 he entered the employ of the Department of National Health and Welfare.

David Shugar was detained by the Royal Canadian Mounted Police in 1946 and charged with conspiring to hand over official secrets to the Russians. The government tried to charge him twice; however, in both situations there was not enough evidence to do so.

He continued working as a researcher, first at the Pasteur Institute in Paris in the years 1948–1950, and later at the Center of Nuclear Physics of the Free University of Brussels until 1952.

On the invitation of professor Leopold Infeld, he moved to Warsaw, where he took the post of the head of the Institute of Biochemistry at the National Institute of Hygiene. Since 1954, he conducted research at the Institute of Biochemistry and Biophysics of the Polish Academy of Sciences. In 1965, he created the Biophysics Department of the Faculty of Physics of University of Warsaw. The same year he was elected the Chairman of the Polish Society of Medical Physics. He was a "Foreign" member of the Polish Academy of Sciences since 1983.

Author of over 300 scientific publications, cited more than 10000 folds. Co-author of the first book on Photochemistry of Nucleic Acids (Shugar, McLaren, Pergamon 1964).

David Shugar obtained in 1969 the honorary degree from Ghent University and in 1995 from the University of Warsaw. In 1976, he received Gold Medal from the International Society of Photobiology. He was an honorary Member of Polish Biochemical Society.

In 1995, he received the Commandor Cross of the Polonia Restituta Order.

In 1999, Professor David Shugar, the founder of the Division of Biophysics and an architect of The Polish School of Molecular Biophysics, was inducted into The Royal Society of Canada. He remained Canadian citizen until his death.

His spouse, Professor Grace Wales Shugar (1918 - 2013), created the Center of the Developmental Psycholinguistics at the Faculty of Psychology of the University of Warsaw.

He died at the age of 100 on 31 October 2015.
