= Stark conjectures =

In number theory, the Stark conjectures, introduced by Stark (1971, 1975, 1976, 1980) and later expanded by Tate (1984), give conjectural information about the coefficient of the leading term in the Taylor expansion of an Artin L-function associated with a Galois extension K/k of algebraic number fields. The conjectures generalize the analytic class number formula expressing the leading coefficient of the Taylor series for the Dedekind zeta function of a number field as the product of a regulator related to S-units of the field and a rational number.

When K/k is an abelian extension and the order of vanishing of the L-function at s = 0 is one, Stark gave a refinement of his conjecture, predicting the existence of certain S-units, called Stark units, which generate abelian extensions of number fields.

== Formulation ==
=== General case ===
The Stark conjectures, in the most general form, predict that the leading coefficient of an Artin L-function is the product of a type of regulator, the Stark regulator, with an algebraic number.

=== Abelian rank-one case ===
When the extension is abelian and the order of vanishing of an L-function at s = 0 is one, Stark's refined conjecture predicts the existence of Stark units, whose roots generate Kummer extensions of K that are abelian over the base field k (and not just abelian over K, as Kummer theory implies). As such, this refinement of his conjecture has theoretical implications for solving Hilbert's twelfth problem.

== Computation ==
Stark units in the abelian rank-one case have been computed in specific examples, allowing verification of the veracity of his refined conjecture. These also provide an important computational tool for generating abelian extensions of number fields, forming the basis for some standard algorithms for computing abelian extensions of number fields.

The first rank-zero cases are used in recent versions of the PARI/GP computer algebra system to compute Hilbert class fields of totally real number fields, and the conjectures provide one solution to Hilbert's twelfth problem, which challenged mathematicians to show how class fields may be constructed over any number field by the methods of complex analysis.

== Progress ==
Stark's principal conjecture has been proven in a few special cases, such as when the character defining the L-function takes on only rational values. Except when the base field is the field of rational numbers or an imaginary quadratic field, which were covered in the work of Stark, the abelian Stark conjectures is still unproved for number fields. More progress has been made in function fields of an algebraic variety.

Manin (2004) related Stark's conjectures to the noncommutative geometry of Alain Connes. This provides a conceptual framework for studying the conjectures, although at the moment it is unclear whether Manin's techniques will yield the actual proof.

== Variations ==
In 1980, Benedict Gross formulated the Gross–Stark conjecture, a p-adic analogue of the Stark conjectures relating derivatives of Deligne–Ribet p-adic L-functions (for totally even characters of totally real number fields) to p-units. This was proved conditionally by Henri Darmon, Samit Dasgupta, and Robert Pollack in 2011. The proof was completed and made unconditional by Dasgupta, Mahesh Kakde, and Kevin Ventullo in 2018. A further refinement of the p-adic conjecture was proposed by Gross in 1988.

In 1984, John Tate formulated the Brumer–Stark conjecture, which gives a refinement of the abelian rank-one Stark conjecture at totally split finite primes (for totally complex extensions of totally real base fields). The function field analogue of the Brumer–Stark conjecture was proved by John Tate and Pierre Deligne in 1984. In 2023, Dasgupta and Kakde proved the Brumer–Stark conjecture away from the prime 2.

In 1996, Karl Rubin proposed an integral refinement of the Stark conjecture in the abelian case. In 1999, Cristian Dumitru Popescu proposed a function field analogue of Rubin's conjecture and proved it in some cases.
