= Hilbert's ninth problem =

On the reciprocity law in algebraic number fields

Hilbert's ninth problem, from the list of 23 Hilbert's problems (1900), asked to find the most general reciprocity law for the norm residues of k-th order in a general algebraic number field, where k is a power of a prime.

The problem was partially solved for abelian extensions by Artin reciprocity and class field theory for abelian extensions of number fields. Generalization of these results to non-abelian class field theory seems to be one of the most challenging problems in algebraic number theory, which is also related with Hilbert's twelfth problem.

== Original statement ==
In english translation of 1902 Hilbert's article the problem is described very briefly:

For any field of numbers the law of reciprocity is to be proved for the residues of the l-th power, when l denotes an odd prime, and further when l is a power of 2 or a power of an odd prime. The law, as well as the means essential to its proof, will, I believe, result by suitably generalizing the theory of the field of the l-th roots of unity, developed by me, and my theory of relative quadratic fields.

== Progress made ==
The problem was partially solved by Artin (1924), Artin (1927) and Artin (1930) by establishing the Artin reciprocity law which deals with abelian extensions of number fields. Together with the work of Teiji Takagi and Helmut Hasse (who established the more general Hasse reciprocity law), this led to the development of the class field theory, realizing Hilbert's program in an abstract fashion. Certain explicit formulas for norm residues were later found by Igor Shafarevich (1948; 1949; 1950).

Robert Langlands in his 1967 letter to André Weil made conjecture about nonabelian reciprocity involving Artin L-functions and automorphic L-functions: for finite number field extension $L/K$, let $\rho$ be irreducible representation of Galois group of this extension and $\mathbf{A}_K$ be adele ring of $K$. If $L(s ,\rho , L/K)$ is Artin L-function for that Galois group and this representation, then Langlands reciprocity conjecture says that there exists automorphic cuspidal representation $\pi$ of general linear group $GL(n,A_K)$ that:

$$L(s, \pi) = L(s ,\rho , L/K)$$

where $L(s, \pi)$ is automorphic L-function for this representation. This conjecture generalizes Artin reciprocity and became starting point for much more general Langlands program. Despite some results towards Langlands program, this conjecture seems to be far from proven, but stands as the best proposition of solution for Hilbert's ninth problem.

== See also ==
- List of unsolved problems in mathematics
