= Brumer–Stark conjecture =

The Brumer–Stark conjecture is a conjecture in algebraic number theory giving a rough generalization of both the analytic class number formula for Dedekind zeta functions, and also of Stickelberger's theorem about the factorization of Gauss sums. It is named after Armand Brumer and Harold Stark.

It arises as a special case (abelian and first-order) of Stark's conjecture, when the place that splits completely in the extension is finite. There are very few cases where the conjecture is known to be valid. Its importance arises, for instance, from its connection with Hilbert's twelfth problem.

== Statement of the conjecture ==
Let K/k be an abelian extension of global fields, and let S be a set of places of k containing the Archimedean places and the prime ideals that ramify in K/k. The S-imprimitive equivariant Artin L-function θ(s) is obtained from the usual equivariant Artin L-function by removing the Euler factors corresponding to the primes in S from the Artin L-functions from which the equivariant function is built. It is a function on the complex numbers taking values in the complex group ring C[G] where G is the Galois group of K/k. It is analytic on the entire plane, excepting a lone simple pole at s = 1.

Let μ_{K} be the group of roots of unity in K. The group G acts on μ_{K}; let A be the annihilator of μ_{K} as a Z[G]-module. An important theorem, first proved by C. L. Siegel and later independently by Takuro Shintani, states that θ(0) is actually in Q[G]. A deeper theorem, proved independently by Pierre Deligne and Ken Ribet, Daniel Barsky, and Pierrette Cassou-Noguès, states that Aθ(0) is in Z[G]. In particular, Wθ(0) is in Z[G], where W is the cardinality of μ_{K}.

The ideal class group of K is a G-module. From the above discussion, we can let Wθ(0) act on it. The Brumer–Stark conjecture says the following:

Brumer–Stark Conjecture. For each nonzero fractional ideal $\mathfrak{a}$ of K, there is an "anti-unit" ε such that

1. $\mathfrak{a}^{W \theta(0)} = (\varepsilon).$
2. The extension $K \left(\varepsilon^{\frac{1}{W}} \right)/k$ is abelian.

The first part of this conjecture is due to Armand Brumer, and Harold Stark originally suggested that the second condition might hold. The conjecture was first stated in published form by John Tate.

The term "anti-unit" refers to the condition that |ε|_{ν} is required to be 1 for each Archimedean place ν.

== Progress ==
The Brumer Stark conjecture is known to be true for extensions K/k where

- K/Q is cyclotomic: this follows from Stickelberger's theorem
- K is abelian over Q
- K/k is a quadratic extension
- K/k is a biquadratic extension

In 2020, Dasgupta and Kakde proved the Brumer–Stark conjecture away from the prime 2. In 2023, a full proof of the conjecture over Z has been announced.

== Function field analogue ==
The analogous statement in the function field case is known to be true, having been proved by John Tate and Pierre Deligne in 1984, with a different proof by David Hayes in 1985.
