= Cristian Dumitru Popescu =

Romanian-American mathematician

Cristian D. Popescu
- Born: 1964 (age 61–62); Novaci, Gorj County, Romania
- Education: University of Bucharest; Ohio State University
- Scientific career
- Fields: Mathematics
- Workplaces: Johns Hopkins University; University of California, San Diego
- Thesis: On a refined Stark conjecture for function fields (1996)
- Doctoral advisor: Karl Rubin

Cristian Dumitru Popescu (born 1964) is a Romanian-American mathematician at the University of California, San Diego. His research interests are in algebraic number theory and arithmetic geometry, and in particular, in special values of L-functions.

== Education and career ==
The son of historian Dumitru Micu Popescu and biologist Rodica Jerișteanu, Popescu was born in 1964 in Novaci, Gorj County. After completing his undergraduate studies at the Faculty of Mathematics of the University of Bucharest, he obtained his Ph.D. from the Ohio State University in 1996, with thesis "On a refined Stark conjecture for function fields" written under the direction of Karl Rubin. He became a professor at Johns Hopkins University, after which he moved to his current position as a professor at the University of California, San Diego.

== Research contributions ==
Popescu formulated and proved function field versions of the Gras conjectures and Rubin's integral refinement of the abelian Stark conjectures. He has also made important contributions to the Stark conjectures over number fields, formulating an alternative to Rubin's refinement, known as Popescu's conjecture. Although slightly weaker than Rubin's conjecture, it has the advantage that it can presently be shown to remain true under raising the base field or lowering the top field of the extension. Popescu and Cornelius Greither formulated equivariant versions of Iwasawa's main conjecture over function fields and number fields, proving unconditionally the function field version and conditionally the number field version. These conjectures have important implications for the Brumer–Stark conjecture, the Coates-Sinnott conjecture and Gross' conjecture on special values of L-functions.

Popescu, in collaboration with his former post-doctoral fellows Joseph Ferrara and Nathan Green and his former PhD student Zachary Higgins, formulated and proved the Equivariant Tamagawa Number Formula for Goss L-functions associated to Drinfeld modules and, more generally, to abelian t-motives. This formula generalizes and refines Lenny Taelman's class-number formula for Drinfeld modules and has important implications in the study of the Galois module structure of Taelman class modules of abelian t-motives.

== Recognition ==
Popescu was awarded the Simion Stoilow Prize by the Romanian Academy in 2002. In 2015-2016, he was a Simons Fellow at Harvard University. In 2025-2026, he was a Simons Fellow at Princeton University. He was a member of the School of Mathematics at the Institute for Advanced Study, Princeton in the Fall Semester of 2024 and the academic year 2025-2026. He was elected to the 2021 class of fellows of the American Mathematical Society "for contributions to number theory and arithmetic geometry". He is an honorary member of the Institute of Mathematics of the Romanian Academy.

In 2024, Popescu was awarded the honorary title "Gorjeanul Anului 2023" by Gorj County, Romania, for his contributions to mathematics and mathematics education. In 2025, he was named "Honorary Citizen" by the mayor's office of his native city of Novaci.
