= Hilbert's twelfth problem =

Problem about mathematical number fields

Es handelt sich um meinen liebsten Jugendtraum, nämlich um den Nachweis, dass die Abel’schen Gleichungen mit Quadratwurzeln rationaler Zahlen durch die Transformations-Gleichungen elliptischer Functionen mit singularen Moduln grade so erschöpft werden, wie die ganzzahligen Abel’schen Gleichungen durch die Kreisteilungsgleichungen.

— Kronecker in a letter to Dedekind in 1880 reproduced in volume V of his collected works, page 455

Hilbert's twelfth problem is the extension of the Kronecker–Weber theorem on abelian extensions of the rational numbers, to any base number field. It is one of the 23 mathematical Hilbert problems and asks for analogues of the roots of unity that generate a whole family of further number fields, analogously to the cyclotomic fields and their subfields. Leopold Kronecker described the complex multiplication issue as his liebster Jugendtraum, or "dearest dream of his youth", so the problem is also known as Kronecker's Jugendtraum.

The classical theory of complex multiplication, now often known as the Kronecker Jugendtraum, does this for the case of any imaginary quadratic field, by using modular functions and elliptic functions chosen with a particular period lattice related to the field in question. Goro Shimura extended this to CM fields. In the special case of totally real fields, Samit Dasgupta and Mahesh Kakde provided a construction of the maximal abelian extension of totally real fields using the Brumer–Stark conjecture.

The general case of Hilbert's twelfth problem is still open.

== Description of the problem ==
The fundamental problem of algebraic number theory is to describe the fields of algebraic numbers. The work of Galois made it clear that field extensions are controlled by certain groups, the Galois groups. The simplest situation, which is already at the boundary of what is well understood, is when the group in question is abelian. All quadratic extensions, obtained by adjoining the roots of a quadratic polynomial, are abelian, and their study was commenced by Gauss. Another type of abelian extension of the field Q of rational numbers is given by adjoining the nth roots of unity, resulting in the cyclotomic fields. Already Gauss had shown that, in fact, every quadratic field is contained in a larger cyclotomic field. The Kronecker–Weber theorem shows that any finite abelian extension of Q is contained in a cyclotomic field. Kronecker's (and Hilbert's) question addresses the situation of a more general algebraic number field K: what are the algebraic numbers necessary to construct all abelian extensions of K? The complete answer to this question has been completely worked out only when K is an imaginary quadratic field or its generalization, a CM-field.

Hilbert's original statement of his 12th problem is rather misleading: he seems to imply that the abelian extensions of imaginary quadratic fields are generated by special values of elliptic modular functions, which is not correct. (It is hard to tell exactly what Hilbert was saying, one problem being that he may have been using the term "elliptic function" to mean both the elliptic function ℘ and the elliptic modular function j.) First it is also necessary to use roots of unity, though Hilbert may have implicitly meant to include these. More seriously, while values of elliptic modular functions generate the Hilbert class field, for more general abelian extensions one also needs to use values of elliptic functions. For example, the abelian extension $\mathbf{Q}(i,\sqrt[4]{1+2i})/\mathbf{Q}(i)$ is not generated by singular moduli and roots of unity.

One particularly appealing way to state the Kronecker–Weber theorem is by saying that the maximal abelian extension of Q can be obtained by adjoining the special values exp(2πi/n) of the exponential function. Similarly, the theory of complex multiplication shows that the maximal abelian extension of Q(τ), where τ is an imaginary quadratic irrationality, can be obtained by adjoining the special values of ℘(τ,z) and j(τ) of modular functions j and elliptic functions ℘, and roots of unity, where τ is in the imaginary quadratic field and z represents a torsion point on the corresponding elliptic curve. One interpretation of Hilbert's twelfth problem asks to provide a suitable analogue of exponential, elliptic, or modular functions, whose special values would generate the maximal abelian extension K^{ab} of a general number field K. In this form, it remains unsolved. A description of the field K^{ab} was obtained in the class field theory, developed by Hilbert himself, Emil Artin, and others in the first half of the 20th century. (Note: In particular, Teiji Takagi proved the existence of the absolute abelian extension as the well-known Takagi existence theorem.) However the construction of K^{ab} in class field theory involves first constructing larger non-abelian extensions using Kummer theory, and then cutting down to the abelian extensions, so does not really solve Hilbert's problem which asks for a more direct construction of the abelian extensions.

== Modern developments ==
Developments since around 1960 have certainly contributed. Before that Hecke (1912) in his dissertation used Hilbert modular forms to study abelian extensions of real quadratic fields. Complex multiplication of abelian varieties was an area opened up by the work of Shimura and Taniyama. This gives rise to abelian extensions of CM-fields in general. The question of which extensions can be found is that of the Tate modules of such varieties, as Galois representations. Since this is the most accessible case of $l$-adic cohomology, these representations have been studied in depth.

Robert Langlands argued in 1973 that the modern version of the Jugendtraum should deal with Hasse–Weil zeta functions of Shimura varieties. While he envisaged a grandiose program that would take the subject much further, more than thirty years later serious doubts remain concerning its import for the question that Hilbert asked.

A separate development was Stark's conjecture (in the abelian rank-one case), which in contrast dealt directly with the question of finding particular units that generate abelian extensions of number fields and describe leading coefficients of Artin L-functions. In 2021, Dasgupta and Kakde announced a p-adic solution to finding the maximal abelian extension of totally real fields by proving the integral Gross–Stark conjecture for Brumer–Stark units.
