= Mahesh Kakde =

Mathematician

- Born: 1983 (age 42–43); Akola, India
- Occupation: Algebraic number theorist
- Employer: Indian Institute of Science
- Known for: Partial results for the Brumer-Stark conjecture and Hilbert's 12th problem
- Awards: Infosys Prize (2022); ICTP Ramanujan Prize (2026)

Mahesh Ramesh Kakde (born 1983) is a mathematician working in algebraic number theory.

== Biography ==
Mahesh Kakde was born on 1983 in Akola, India. He obtained a Bachelor of Mathematics degree at the Indian Statistical Institute in Bangalore in 2004, and a Certificate of Advanced Study in Mathematics at the University of Cambridge in 2005. He completed his PhD under the supervision of John Coates at the University of Cambridge in 2008. He subsequently worked at Princeton University, University College London, and King's College London, before becoming a professor at the Indian Institute of Science in 2019.

== Research ==
Kakde proved the main conjecture of Iwasawa theory in the totally real μ = 0 case. Together with Samit Dasgupta and Kevin Ventullo, he proved the Gross–Stark conjecture. In a joint project with Samit Dasgupta, they proved the Brumer–Stark conjecture away from 2 in 2020, and later over $\mathbb Z$ in 2023. Generalising these methods, they also gave a solution to Hilbert's 12th problem for totally real fields. Their methods were subsequently used by Johnston and Nickel to prove the equivariant Iwasawa main conjecture for abelian extensions without the μ = 0 hypothesis.

== Awards ==
In 2019, Kakde was awarded a Swarnajayanti Fellowship.

Together with Samit Dasgupta, Kakde was one of the invited speakers at the International Congress of Mathematicians 2022, where they gave a joint talk on their work on the Brumer–Stark conjecture.

In 2022, Kakde received the Infosys Prize for his contributions to algebraic number theory. In his congratulatory message, Jury Chair Chandrashekhar Khare noted that "[Kakde’s] work on the main conjecture of non-commutative Iwasawa theory, on the Gross-Stark conjecture and on the Brumer-Stark conjecture has had a big impact on the field of algebraic number theory. His work makes important progress towards a p-adic analytic analog of Hilbert’s 12th problem on construction of abelian extensions of number fields."

In 2023, Kakde became a laureate of the Asian Scientist 100 by the Asian Scientist.
