= Dirichlet's unit theorem =

Gives the rank of the group of units in the ring of algebraic integers of a number field

In mathematics, Dirichlet's unit theorem is a basic result in algebraic number theory due to Peter Gustav Lejeune Dirichlet. It determines the rank of the group of units in the ring O_{K} of algebraic integers of a number field K. The regulator is a positive real number that determines how "dense" the units are.

The statement is that the group of units is finitely generated and has rank (maximal number of multiplicatively independent elements) equal to

r = r_{1} + r_{2} − 1

where r_{1} is the number of real embeddings and r_{2} the number of conjugate pairs of complex embeddings of K. This characterisation of r_{1} and r_{2} is based on the idea that there will be as many ways to embed K in the complex number field as the degree $n = [K: \mathbb{Q}]$; these will either be into the real numbers, or pairs of embeddings related by complex conjugation, so that

n = r_{1} + 2r_{2}.

Note that if K is Galois over $\mathbb{Q}$ then either r_{1} = 0 or r_{2} = 0.

Other ways of determining r_{1} and r_{2} are

- use the primitive element theorem to write $K = \mathbb{Q}(\alpha)$, and then r_{1} is the number of conjugates of α that are real, 2r_{2} the number that are complex; in other words, if f is the minimal polynomial of α over $\mathbb{Q}$, then r_{1} is the number of real roots and 2r_{2} is the number of non-real complex roots of f (which come in complex conjugate pairs);
- write the tensor product of fields $K \otimes_{\mathbb{Q}} \mathbb{R}$ as a product of fields, there being r_{1} copies of $\mathbb{R}$ and r_{2} copies of $\mathbb{C}$.

As an example, if K is a quadratic field, the rank is 1 if it is a real quadratic field, and 0 if an imaginary quadratic field. The theory for real quadratic fields is essentially the theory of Pell's equation.

The rank is positive for all number fields besides $\mathbb{Q}$ and imaginary quadratic fields, which have rank 0. The 'size' of the units is measured in general by a determinant called the regulator. In principle a basis for the units can be effectively computed; in practice the calculations are quite involved when n is large.

The torsion in the group of units is the set of all roots of unity of K, which form a finite cyclic group. For a number field with at least one real embedding the torsion must therefore be only {1,−1}. There are number fields, for example most imaginary quadratic fields, having no real embeddings which also have {1,−1} for the torsion of its unit group.

Totally real fields are special with respect to units. If L/K is a finite extension of number fields with degree greater than 1 and the units groups for the integers of L and K have the same rank then K is totally real and L is a totally complex quadratic extension. The converse holds too. (An example is K equal to the rationals and L equal to an imaginary quadratic field; both have unit rank 0.)

The theorem not only applies to the maximal order O_{K} but to any order O ⊂ O_{K}.

There is a generalisation of the unit theorem by Helmut Hasse (and later Claude Chevalley) to describe the structure of the group of S-units, determining the rank of the unit group in localizations of rings of integers. Also, the Galois module structure of $\mathbb{Q} \oplus O_{K, S} \otimes_{\mathbb{Z}} \mathbb{Q}$ has been determined.

== The regulator ==
Suppose that K is a number field and $u_1, \dots, u_r$ are a set of generators for the unit group of K modulo roots of unity. There will be r + 1 Archimedean places of K, either real or complex. For $u\in K$, write $u^{(1)},\dots,u^{(r+1)}$ for the different embeddings into $\mathbb{R}$ or $\mathbb{C}$ and set N_{j} to 1 or 2 if the corresponding embedding is real or complex respectively. Then the r × (r + 1) matrix
$$\left(N_j\log \left|u_i^{(j)}\right|\right)_{i=1,\dots,r,\; j=1,\dots,r+1}$$
has the property that the sum of any row is zero (because all units have norm 1, and the log of the norm is the sum of the entries in a row). This implies that the absolute value R of the determinant of the submatrix formed by deleting one column is independent of the column. The number R is called the regulator of the algebraic number field (it does not depend on the choice of generators u_{i}). It measures the "density" of the units: if the regulator is small, this means that there are "lots" of units.

The regulator has the following geometric interpretation. The map taking a unit u to the vector with entries $N_j\log \left|u^{(j)}\right|$ has an image in the r-dimensional subspace of $\mathbb{R}^{r + 1}$ consisting of all vectors whose entries have sum 0, and by Dirichlet's unit theorem the image is a lattice in this subspace. The volume of a fundamental domain of this lattice is $R\sqrt{r + 1}$.

The regulator of an algebraic number field of degree greater than 2 is usually quite cumbersome to calculate, though there are now computer algebra packages that can do it in many cases. It is usually much easier to calculate the product hR of the class number h and the regulator using the class number formula, and the main difficulty in calculating the class number of an algebraic number field is usually the calculation of the regulator.

=== Examples ===
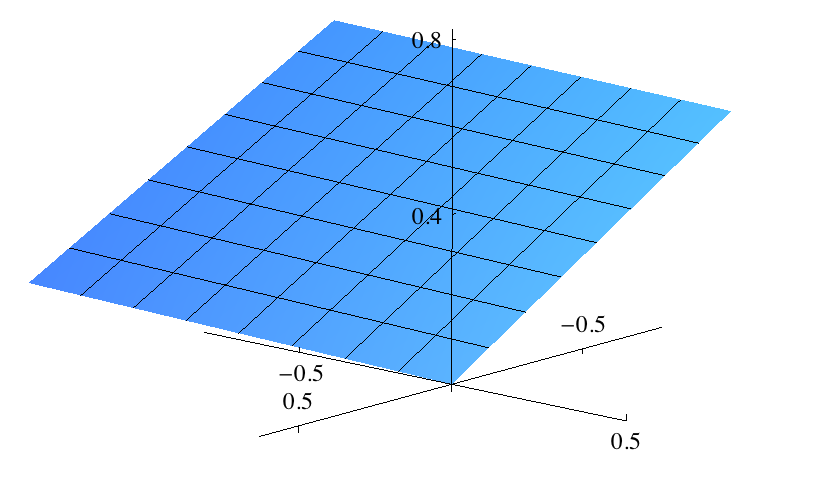
A fundamental domain in logarithmic space of the group of units of the cyclic cubic field K obtained by adjoining to $\mathbb{Q}$ a root of f(x) = x^{3} + x^{2} − 2x − 1. If α denotes a root of f(x), then a set of fundamental units is {ε_{1}, ε_{2}}, where ε_{1} = α^{2} + α − 1 and ε_{2} = 2 − α^{2}. The area of the fundamental domain is approximately 0.910114, so the regulator of K is approximately 0.525455.

- The regulator of an imaginary quadratic field, or of the rational integers, is 1 (as the determinant of a 0 × 0 matrix is 1).
- The regulator of a real quadratic field is the logarithm of its fundamental unit: for example, that of the golden field $\Q\bigl(\sqrt5~\!\bigr)$ is $\log \tfrac12\bigl(1 + \sqrt{5}~\!\bigr)$. This can be seen as follows. A fundamental unit is the golden ratio $\tfrac12\bigl(1 + \sqrt{5}~\!\bigr)$, and its images under the two embeddings into $\R$ are $\tfrac12\bigl(1 + \sqrt{5}~\!\bigr)$ and $\tfrac12\bigl(1 - \sqrt{5}~\!\bigr)$. So the r × (r + 1) matrix is
  $$\left[1\times\log\left|\frac{\sqrt{5} + 1}{2}\right|, \quad 1\times \log\left|\frac{-\sqrt{5} + 1}{2}\right|\ \right].$$
- The regulator of the cyclic cubic field $\mathbb{Q}(\alpha)$, where α is a root of x^{3} + x^{2} − 2x − 1, is approximately 0.5255. A basis of the group of units modulo roots of unity is {ε_{1}, ε_{2}} where ε_{1} = α^{2} + α − 1 and ε_{2} = 2 − α^{2}.

== Higher regulators ==
A 'higher' regulator refers to a construction for a function on an algebraic K-group with index n > 1 that plays the same role as the classical regulator does for the group of units, which is a group K_{1}. A theory of such regulators has been in development, with work of Armand Borel and others. Such higher regulators play a role, for example, in the Beilinson conjectures, and are expected to occur in evaluations of certain L-functions at integer values of the argument. See also Beilinson regulator.

== Stark regulator ==
The formulation of Stark's conjectures led Harold Stark to define what is now called the Stark regulator, similar to the classical regulator as a determinant of logarithms of units, attached to any Artin representation.

== p-adic regulator ==
Let K be a number field and for each prime P of K above some fixed rational prime p, let U_{P} denote the local units at P and let U_{1,P} denote the subgroup of principal units in U_{P}. Set
$$U_1 = \prod_{P|p} U_{1,P}.$$

Then let E_{1} denote the set of global units ε that map to U_{1} via the diagonal embedding of the global units in E.

Since E_{1} is a finite-index subgroup of the global units, it is an abelian group of rank r_{1} + r_{2} − 1. The p-adic regulator is the determinant of the matrix formed by the p-adic logarithms of the generators of this group. Leopoldt's conjecture states that this determinant is non-zero.

== See also ==
- Elliptic unit
- Cyclotomic unit
- Shintani's unit theorem
