= Non-abelian class field theory =

In mathematics, non-abelian class field theory is a catchphrase, meaning the extension of the results of class field theory, the relatively complete and classical set of results on abelian extensions of any number field K, to the general Galois extension L/K. While class field theory was essentially known by 1930, the corresponding non-abelian theory has never been formulated in a definitive and accepted sense.

== History ==
A presentation of class field theory in terms of group cohomology was carried out by Claude Chevalley, Emil Artin and others, mainly in the 1940s. This resulted in a formulation of the central results by means of the group cohomology of the idele class group. The theorems of the cohomological approach are independent of whether or not the Galois group G of L/K is abelian. This theory has never been regarded as the sought-after non-abelian theory. The first reason that can be cited for that is that it did not provide fresh information on the splitting of prime ideals in a Galois extension; a common way to explain the objective of a non-abelian class field theory is that it should provide a more explicit way to express such patterns of splitting.

The cohomological approach therefore was of limited use in even formulating non-abelian class field theory. Behind the history was the wish of Chevalley to write proofs for class field theory without using Dirichlet series: in other words to eliminate L-functions. The first wave of proofs of the central theorems of class field theory was structured as consisting of two 'inequalities' (the same structure as in the proofs now given of the fundamental theorem of Galois theory, though much more complex). One of the two inequalities involved an argument with L-functions.

In a later reversal of this development, it was realised that to generalize Artin reciprocity to the non-abelian case, it was essential in fact to seek a new way of expressing Artin L-functions. The contemporary formulation of this ambition is by means of the Langlands program: in which grounds are given for believing Artin L-functions are also L-functions of automorphic representations. As of the early twenty-first century, this is the formulation of the notion of non-abelian class field theory that has widest expert acceptance.

== See also ==
- Anabelian geometry
- Frobenioid
- Langlands correspondences
