= Equivariant L-function =

In algebraic number theory, an equivariant Artin L-function is a function associated to a finite Galois extension of global fields created by packaging together the various Artin L-functions associated with the extension. Each extension has many traditional Artin L-functions associated with it, corresponding to the characters of representations of the Galois group. By contrast, each extension has a unique corresponding equivariant L-function.

Equivariant L-functions have become increasingly important as a wide range of conjectures and theorems in number theory have been developed around them. Among these are the Brumer–Stark conjecture, the Coates-Sinnott conjecture, and a recently developed equivariant version of the main conjecture in Iwasawa theory.
