= Henri Darmon =

Canadian mathematician

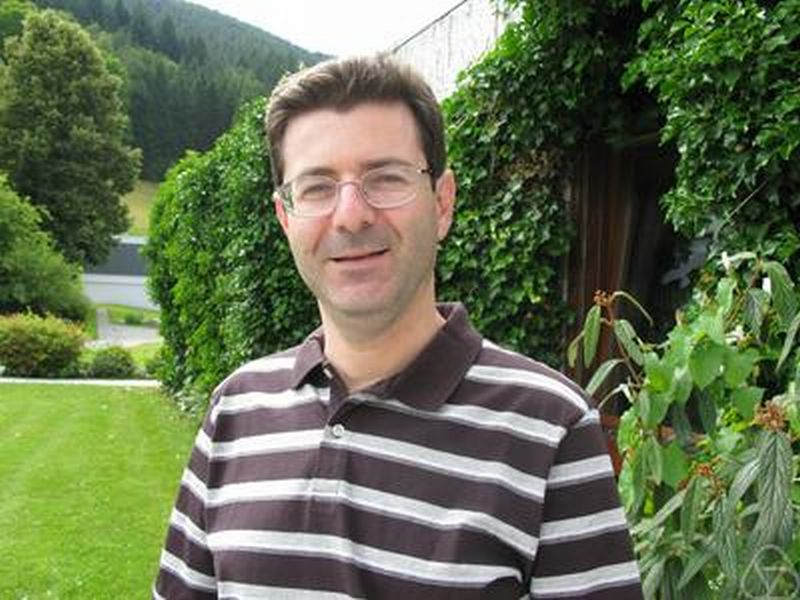
- Born: 22 October 1965 (age 61); Paris, France
- Education: Harvard University; McGill University
- Awards: Coxeter–James Prize (1998); Ribenboim Prize (2002); Cole Prize in Number Theory (2017); CRM-Fields-PIMS Prize (2017)
- Scientific career
- Fields: Mathematics
- Workplaces: McGill University
- Doctoral advisor: Benedict Gross
- Doctoral students: Samit Dasgupta

Henri Rene Darmon (born 22 October 1965) is a French-Canadian mathematician. He is a number theorist who works on Hilbert's 12th problem and its relation with the Birch–Swinnerton-Dyer conjecture. He is currently a professor of mathematics at McGill University.

== Career ==
Darmon received his BSc from McGill University in 1987 and his PhD from Harvard University in 1991 under supervision of Benedict Gross. From 1991 to 1996, he held positions in Princeton University. Since 1994, he has been a professor at McGill University.

== Awards ==
Darmon was elected to the Royal Society of Canada in 2003. In 2008, he was awarded the Royal Society of Canada's John L. Synge Award. He received the 2017 AMS Cole Prize in Number Theory "for his contributions to the arithmetic of elliptic curves and modular forms", and the 2017 CRM-Fields-PIMS Prize, which is awarded in recognition of exceptional research achievement in the mathematical sciences. He was elected as a Fellow of the American Mathematical Society, in the 2025 class of fellows. He was awarded the 2026 Jeffery-Williams Prize, in recognition of his important and sustained contributions to number theory and arithmetic geometry.

== Personal life ==
Darmon is married to Galia Dafni, also a mathematician at Concordia University.
