= Samit Dasgupta =

American mathematician at Duke University

- Education: Harvard University; University of California, Berkeley
- Awards: Sloan Research Fellowship (2009)
- Scientific career
- Fields: Mathematics
- Workplaces: Duke University
- Thesis: Gross-Stark Units, Stark-Heegner Points, and Class Fields of Real Quadratic Fields (2004)
- Doctoral advisor: Ken Ribet; Henri Darmon

Samit Dasgupta is a professor of mathematics at Duke University working in algebraic number theory.

== Biography ==
Dasgupta graduated from Montgomery Blair High School in 1995 and placed fourth in the 1995 Westinghouse Science Talent Search with a project on Schinzel's hypothesis H. He then attended Harvard University, where he received a bachelor's degree in 1999. In 2004, Dasgupta received a PhD in mathematics from University of California, Berkeley under the supervision of Ken Ribet and Henri Darmon.

Dasgupta was previously a faculty member at University of California, Santa Cruz. As of 2020, he is a professor of mathematics at Duke University.

== Research ==
Dasgupta's research is focused on special values of L-functions, algebraic points on abelian varieties, and units in number fields. In particular, Dasgupta's research has focused on the Stark conjectures and Heegner points.

== Awards ==
In 2009, Dasgupta received a Sloan Research Fellowship. He was named a Fellow of the American Mathematical Society, in the 2022 class of fellows, "for contributions to number theory, in particular the theory of special values of classical and p-adic L-functions".

== Selected publications ==
- Darmon, Henri; Dasgupta, Samit (2006). "Elliptic units for real quadratic fields". Annals of Mathematics. 163 (1): 301–346. doi:10.4007/annals.2006.163.301. ISSN 0003-486X.
- Dasgupta, Samit; Darmon, Henri; Pollack, Robert (2011). "Hilbert modular forms and the Gross-Stark conjecture". Annals of Mathematics. 174 (1): 439–484. doi:10.4007/annals.2011.174.1.12. ISSN 0003-486X.
- Dasgupta, Samit; Kakde, Mahesh; Ventullo, Kevin (2018). "On the Gross–Stark Conjecture". Annals of Mathematics. 188 (3): 833. doi:10.4007/annals.2018.188.3.3. JSTOR 10.4007/annals.2018.188.3.3. S2CID 53554124.
- Dasgupta, Samit; Spieß, Michael (2018). "Partial zeta values, Gross's tower of fields conjecture, and Gross–Stark units". Journal of the European Mathematical Society. 20 (11): 2643–2683. doi:10.4171/JEMS/821. ISSN 1435-9855.
- Dasgupta, Samit (2016). "Factorization of p-adic Rankin L-series". Inventiones Mathematicae. 205 (1): 221–268. Bibcode:2016InMat.205..221D. doi:10.1007/s00222-015-0634-4. ISSN 0020-9910. S2CID 17144046.
