= Galia Dafni =

Mathematician

Galia Devora Dafni is a mathematician specializing in harmonic analysis and function spaces. Educated in the US, she works in Canada as a professor of mathematics and statistics at Concordia University. She is also affiliated with the Centre de Recherches Mathématiques, where she is deputy director for publications and communication.

== Education ==
Dafni lived in Texas as a teenager. After beginning her undergraduate studies at the University of Texas at Austin, Dafni transferred to Pennsylvania State University, where she earned a bachelor's degree in 1988 in mathematics and computer science, "with highest distinction and with honors in mathematics". She went to Princeton University for graduate study in mathematics, earning a master's degree in 1990 and completing her Ph.D. in 1993. Her doctoral dissertation, Hardy Spaces on Strongly Pseudoconvex Domains in $C^n$ and Domains of Finite Type in $C^2$, was supervised by Elias M. Stein.

== Career ==
After another year as an instructor at Princeton, Dafni continues through three postdoctoral positions: as Charles B. Morrey Jr. Assistant Professor of Mathematics at the University of California, Berkeley from 1994 to 1996, as Ralph Boas Assistant Professor of Mathematics at Northwestern University from 1996 to 1998, and as a postdoctoral fellow and research assistant professor at Concordia University from 1998 to 2000. Her move to Montreal and Concordia was motivated in part by a two-body problem with her husband, who also worked in Montreal.

Finally, in 2000, she obtained a regular-rank assistant professorship at Concordia, supported by a 5-year NSERC University Faculty Award, through a program to support women in STEM. She obtained tenure there as an associate professor in 2005, and since became a full professor.

== Personal life ==
Dafni is married to Henri Darmon, a mathematician at another Montreal university, McGill University. They met in the early 1990s at Princeton, where Darmon was a postdoctoral researcher.
