= Artin L-function =

Type of Dirichlet series associated to number field extensions

In mathematics, Artin L-functions are a type of Dirichlet series defined for finite extensions of number fields, encoding informations about linear representations of Galois group, ramification of prime ideals and distribution of absolute norms of ideals.

These functions were introduced in 1923 by Emil Artin, in connection with his research into class field theory. They play an important role in modern number theory and are generalizations of better-known functions like Dedekind zeta functions or Dirichlet L-functions. Some of their expected properties turned out to be difficult to prove.

One of the aims of proposed non-abelian class field theory is to incorporate the complex-analytic nature of Artin L-functions into a larger framework, such as is provided by automorphic forms and the Langlands program. So far, only a small part of such a theory has been put on a firm basis.

== Definition ==
Let $L/K$ be a finite extension of number fields and $V$ be finite dimensional complex vector space. Let:

- $\rho$ be group representation of $\text{Gal}(L/K)$ on $V$.
- $\mathcal{O}_K$ denote ring of integers for $K$.
- $N(I)$ denote absolute norm for ideals in $\mathcal{O}_K$
- $I_{\mathfrak{p}}$ denote inertia group for any non-zero prime ideal $\mathfrak{p}\subseteq \mathcal{O_K}$.
- $V^{I_{\mathfrak{p}}}$ be subspace of $V$ fixed pointwise by all linear maps in $\rho(I_{\mathfrak{p}})$.
- $\mathbf{Frob}_\mathfrak{p} \in \text{Gal}(L/K)$ be Frobenius element for $\mathfrak{p}$ in that extension.

Artin L-function is then defined as Euler product taken over all prime ideals in $\mathcal{O}_K$:

$$L(s,\rho,L/K)=\prod_{\mathfrak{p}\subseteq \mathcal{O}_K}\frac{1}
{\det
\left[\,\operatorname{Id}-N(\mathfrak{p})^{-s}{\cdot}\rho(\mathbf{Frob}_\mathfrak{p})
\mid V^{I_{\mathfrak{p}}}\,\right]
}$$

For each factor of Euler product determinant is taken on a linear map restricted to $V^{I_{\mathfrak{p}}}$.

This definition is valid in the domain of convergence of this series (shown by Artin to be $\operatorname{Re}(s) > 1$), and for the rest of complex plane the function is defined by analytic continuation.

=== Remarks ===
- Almost all prime ideals in a finite extension of a number field are unramified, in which case $I_\mathfrak{p}$ is trivial and $V^{I_{\mathfrak{p}}}=V$. Restriction of the linear mapping is used to deal with ramified prime ideals, which are vital features of most number fields.
- The Frobenius element need not be unique. For unramified primes all Frobenius elements are conjugates in the Galois group, hence the value of the factor is the same regardless of the choice (see Properties below). For ramified primes, except for conjugation, the Frobenius element can be any element of a coset with respect to $I_{\mathfrak{p}}$, which gives a unique restriction to $V^{I_{\mathfrak{p}}}$.
- It is arguably more natural to make a definition not in terms the invariants but of coinvariants, the largest quotient space fixed by $I_\mathfrak{p}$, but the resulting function will be the same.

== Properties ==
Most of the properties of Artin L-functions generalize properties known for other functions like Dedekind zeta functions and Dirichlet L-functions.

=== Basic properties ===
==== Additivity ====
Artin L-functions behave well with respect to direct sum of representations:

$$L(s,\rho_1 \oplus \rho_2,L/K)=L(s,\rho_1,L/K)\cdot L(s,\rho_2,L/K)$$

==== Inductivity ====
Artin L-functions behave well to induction of representations. Let $K \subseteq L \subseteq M$ be tower of finite number field extensions. Let $H=\text{Gal}(M/L)$ and $G=\text{Gal}(M/K)$ be Galois groups for respective extensions. It is easy to observe that $H$ is subgroup of $G$. If $\rho$ is representation of $H$, then for induced representation on larger group:

$$L(s,\rho,M/L)=L(s,\text{Ind}_{H}^{G}(\rho),M/K)$$

==== Inflation ====
It is easy to check by comparing Euler products over prime ideals, that for the trivial representation of the Galois group, the Artin L-function is the Dedekind zeta function of the smaller field:

$$L(s,\mathfrak{1},L/K)=\zeta_K(s)$$

Since this function is independent of the larger field, this property is called inflation.

==== Relation to characters ====
Denote the character of the representation $\rho$ as $\chi_\rho$. From the formula:

$$\log(\det(M))=\operatorname{tr}(\log(M))$$

it follows that logarithm of every factor of Artin L-function can be written as:

$$-\log(\det([\operatorname{Id}-N(\mathfrak{p})^{-s}\cdot\rho(\mathbf{Frob}_\mathfrak{p})]\vert_{V^{I_{\mathfrak{p}}}}))=\sum_{m=1}^{\infty}\frac{\chi_{\rho|_{V^{I_{\mathfrak{p}}}}}(\mathbf{Frob}_\mathfrak{p}^m)}{m}N(\mathfrak{p})^{-sm}$$

Taking the logarithm of the product of all factors of the function:

$$\log(L(s,\rho,L/K)) =-\sum_{\mathfrak{p}\subseteq \mathcal{O}_K}\sum_{m=1}^{\infty}\frac{\chi_{\rho|_{V^{I_{\mathfrak{p}}}}}(\mathbf{Frob}_\mathfrak{p}^m)}{m}N(\mathfrak{p})^{-sm}$$

From this relation it follows that for a given extension of number fields, the Artin L-function can be defined using only the character of the representation. Particularly, equivalent representations define the same Artin L-function. Since the character is a class function, this shows that after restriction to $V^{I_\mathfrak{p}}$ value of factor is independent of the choice of Frobenius element.

Each basic property of Artin L-function can also be rewritten in terms of characters. If $\chi_1, \chi_2$ are characters of respectively $\rho_1, \rho_2$ then additivity property becomes:

$$L(s,\chi_1 + \chi_2,L/K)=L(s,\chi_1,L/K)\cdot L(s,\chi_2,L/K)$$

If $\chi_{\mathfrak{1}}$ is character of trivial representation, then inflation property is equivalent to:

$$L(s,\chi_{\mathfrak{1}},L/K)=\zeta_K(s)$$

If $\chi_{H}^{G}$ is induced character then inductivity property is equivalent to:

$$L(s,\chi,M/L)=L(s,\chi_{H}^{G},M/K)$$

Character form of L-function is useful for showing some properties like existence of analytic continuation or factorization of Dedekind zeta functions by Artin L-functions.

=== Factorization of Dedekind zeta functions ===
One of the main applications of Artin L-functions is to provide non-trivial factorizations for Dedekind zeta functions.

==== Galois case ====
If $L/K$ is a Galois extension, then for the regular representation of the Galois group, the Artin L-function is the Dedekind zeta function of the larger field:

$$L(s,\rho_{\text{reg}},L/K)=\zeta_L(s)$$

Since Artin L-functions behave well with respect to direct sums and regular representations for finite groups decompose into irreducible representations, it is usually written as

$$\zeta_L(s) = \prod_{\rho \text{ irr}} L(s,\rho,L/K)^{\deg(\rho)}$$

where the index runs over all irreducible representations of Galois group. The proof of this equality is rather straightforward, but some steps require results from character theory and splitting of prime ideals in Galois extensions.

Proof

Let $n=[L:K]$. By $L_{\mathfrak{p}}(s,\rho,L/K)$ denote factor of L-function for prime ideal $\mathfrak{p}$ in $\mathcal{O}_K$ and by $\chi_\rho$ character of representation restricted to $V^{I_\mathfrak{p}}$. For $\mathfrak{p}$ we have factorization:

$$\mathfrak{p}\mathcal{O}_L=\prod_{i=1}^g P_i^{e_i}$$

where $P_i$ are prime ideals lying above $\mathfrak{p}$ in this extension with inertia degrees $f_i$. Using that $L/K$ is Galois extension, then for each $i, j = 1,\dots ,g$ there is:

$$e_i=e_j \quad \text{,} \quad f_i=f_j \quad \text{and} \quad efg=n$$

$e=e_i$ is called ramification index and $f=f_i$ is called inertia degree for ideal $\mathfrak{p}$, and there is:. Now take logarithm of factor of L-function for this ideal:

$$-\log(L_{\mathfrak{p}}(s,\rho,L/K))=\sum_{m=1}^{\infty}\frac{\chi_\rho(\mathbf{Frob}_\mathfrak{p}^m)}{m}N(\mathfrak{p})^{-sm}$$

Before summation for all irreducible representations recall fact from character theory, that if index runs all irreducible representations of finite group $G$:

$$\sum_{\rho \text{ irr}}\chi_\rho(e_G) \chi_\rho(\sigma)) = \begin{cases} |G| & \sigma = e_G \\ 0 & \sigma \neq e_G \end{cases}$$

where $e_G$ denotes neutral element of group $G$ (don't confuse with ramification index). After restriction to subspace $V^{I_\mathfrak{p}}$ irreducible representations of $G$ actually corresponds to irreducible representations of quatient group. Since ramification index equals order of inertia group, and for Galois extension order of Galois group equals degree of extension:

$$|G|=|\text{Gal}(L/K)/I_\mathfrak{p}|=\tfrac{n}{e}$$.

Taking summation for all irreducible representations and using fact that order of Frobenius element in $\text{Gal}(L/K)/I_\mathfrak{p}$ is equal to inertia degree, we will get:

$$\sum_{\rho \text{ irr}}\sum_{m=1}^{\infty}\frac{\chi(e_G)\chi_\rho(\mathbf{Frob}_\mathfrak{p}^m)}{m}N(\mathfrak{p})^{-sm}=\frac{n}{e}\sum_{m=1}^{\infty}\frac{1}{fm}N(\mathfrak{p})^{-sfm}$$

Using that $efg=n$, we will get:

$$\frac{n}{e}\sum_{m=1}^{\infty}\frac{1}{fm}N(\mathfrak{p})^{-sfm}=g\sum_{m=1}^{\infty}\frac{1}{m}N(\mathfrak{p})^{-sfm}$$

Using formula for Taylor expansion of logarithm we can collapse series at right side:

$$g\sum_{m=1}^{\infty}\frac{1}{m}N(\mathfrak{p})^{-sfm}=-g\log(1-N(\mathfrak{p})^{-sf})$$

Exponentiating both sides and using $\chi(e_G)=\deg \rho$ we get:

$$\prod_{\rho \text{ irr}}L_\mathfrak{p}(s,\rho,L/K)^{\deg(\rho)}=\frac{1}{(1-N(\mathfrak{p})^{-fs})^g}$$

Now using fact that there are $g$ distinct prime ideals over $\mathfrak{p}$, for each of them their absolute norms: $N(P_i)=N(P_j)$ and that: $N(\mathfrak{p})^f=N(P_i)$ we will get:

$$\frac{1}{(1-N(\mathfrak{p})^{-fs})^g}=\prod_{i=1}^g \frac{1}{1-N(P_i)^{-s}}$$

Finally taking product over all prime ideals in $\mathcal{O}_K$ and taking notice on splitting of ideals we would get:

$$\prod_{\rho \text{ irr}}L(s,\rho,L/K)^{\operatorname{deg}(\rho)} = \prod_{\mathfrak{p}\subseteq \mathcal{O}_K}\frac{1}{(1-N(\mathfrak{p})^{-fs})^g} = \prod_{P\subseteq \mathcal{O}_L}\frac{1}{1-N(P)^{-s}}$$

Which equals Euler product for Dedekind zeta function for $L$:

$$\prod_{P\subseteq \mathcal{O}_L}\frac{1}{1-N(P)^{-s}}=\zeta_L(s)$$

==== General case ====
It is possible to obtain the general formula for factorization of Dedekind zeta function for a larger field, but it become more complicated and relies on inductivity property. Denote:

- $M$ be for normal closure for $L/K$
- $H$ be Galois group for $M/L$
- $G$ be Galois group for $M/K$
- $\langle \cdot ,\cdot \rangle$ be product on characters
- $\chi_\rho$ be character of irreducible representation
- $\chi^*$ be character of $\text{Ind}_{H}^{G}(\mathcal{1})$

Then the factorization of Dedekind zeta function is as follows:

$$\zeta_L(s)=\prod_{\rho \text{ irr}}L(s,\text{Ind}_{H}^{G}(\rho),M/K)^{\langle \chi_\rho,\chi^*\rangle}$$

=== Analytic continuation ===
In the general case Artin L-functions were proven to have meromorphic continuation to complex plane. Using the Brauer theorem on induced characters it can be shown that each character can be written as:

$$\chi_\rho = \sum_{i=1}^{k}m_i\cdot\chi_i$$

where $m_i$ are integers and $\chi_i$ are characters induced from 1-dimensional representations of subgroups. Using inductivity, additivity and Artin reciprocity, the function can be written as:

$$L(s,\chi_\rho,L/K)=\prod_{i=1}^k L(s,\chi_i)^{m_i}$$

where in product we have L-functions for corresponding Hecke characters. Since Hecke L-functions are meromorphic (with only possible pole at $s=1$, when Hecke character is trivial), it gives existence of meromorphic continuation to complex plane.

Brauer's result is already improvement of original theorem proven by Artin, which guaranteed only that some power of Artin L-function is meromorphic, since Artin's theorem used rational coefficients instead of integer.

=== Functional equation ===
Artin L-functions satisfy a functional equation involving Euler gamma function that relates values of $L(s,\rho,L/K)$ with $L(1-s,\rho^*,L/K)$, where $\rho^*$ denotes the complex conjugate representation. Each gamma factor in this equation is tied to Archimedean places introduced on field, in a similar way as factors in Euler product are tied to p-adic places.

Using modern notation from the theory of automorphic forms, let's denote Archimedean gamma factors:

$$\Gamma_{\mathbb{R}}(s)=\pi^{-\frac{s}{2}}\Gamma(\tfrac{s}{2}) \qquad \Gamma_{\mathbb{C}}(s)=2(2\pi)^{-s}\Gamma(s)$$

We define numbers that will be used as exponents in factors of functional equation. For real places, choose a generator $\phi_v$ of group $\text{Gal}(L_v/K_v)$. Then $\rho(\phi_v)$ is an involution on $V$ and has two eigenspaces related to eigenvalues $1,-1$:

$$n_{+}=\dim V_{+} \qquad n_{-}=\dim V_{-}$$

Direct computation shows that alternatively this number can be defined using character of representation:

$$n_{+}=\frac{\chi_\rho(1)+\chi_\rho(\phi_v)}{2}, \quad n_{-}=\frac{\chi_\rho(1)-\chi_\rho(\phi_v)}{2}$$

The factors for Archimedean places depends on whether the place is real or complex:

$$L_v(s,\rho,L/K)=
\begin{cases}
\Gamma_{\mathbb{R}}(s)^{n_{+}}\Gamma_{\mathbb{R}}(s+1)^{n_{-}} &  v\text{ real} \\
\Gamma_{\mathbb{C}}(s)^{\dim \rho} &  v \text{ complex}
\end{cases}$$

The conductor that encodes information about ramification is defined in a following way:

$$c(L/K, \rho) = \Delta_K \cdot N(\mathfrak{f}(\rho))$$

where $\Delta_K$ is discriminant of $K$ and $N(\mathfrak{f}(\rho))$ is absolute norm of Artin conductor for representation $\rho$. Now, define the completed L-function as the product of factors for all places on $L/K$, including the Archimedean ones and conductor for that field extension and representation:

$$\Lambda(s,\rho,L/K)=c(L/K, \rho)^{\frac{s}{2}}\prod_{v}L_v(s,\rho,L/K)$$

The "completed" Artin L-function satisfies the following functional equation (with conjugated representation):

$$\Lambda(s,\rho,L/K)= \epsilon(\rho, L/K)\Lambda(1-s, \rho^*, L/K)$$,

where $\epsilon(\rho)$ is some complex number of absolute value 1, called the Artin root number. This functional equation generalizes equations for Hecke L-functions and Dedekind zeta functions, especially archetypical equation for Riemann zeta function. The case when this equation relates L-function to itself is exactly when ρ and ρ* are equivalent representations. It is, algebraically speaking, the case when ρ is a real representation or quaternionic representation.

The Artin root number is the subject of significant research. Robert Langlands and Pierre Deligne established a factorisation of Artin root number into Langlands–Deligne local constants; this is significant in conjectural relationships to automorphic representations. The Artin root number is, then, either +1 or −1. The question of which sign occurs is linked to Galois module theory.

The functional equation allows one to distinguish between trivial and nontrivial zeros of Artin L-function. Zeros that cancels the poles of Gamma functions are called trivial zeros. Functional equation guarantees that nontrivial zeros and possible poles (conjectured to not exist) must lie in critical strip: $0\leq \operatorname{Re}(s)\leq 1$ and are symmetric with respect to critical line $\operatorname{Re}(s)= \tfrac{1}{2}$.

=== Artin reciprocity ===
A key result in class field theory, Artin reciprocity usually is expressed as existence of certain homomorphism between idele class group and abelianization of Galois group. Equivalent statement says that if $L/K$ is abelian extension and $\rho$ is irreducible representation of its Galois group, then there exists Hecke character $\chi_K$ such that:

$$L(s,\rho,L/K)=L(s,\chi_K)$$

If we have $K=\mathbb{Q}$, then Hecke character can be replaced by Dirichlet character and Hecke L-function becomes Dirichlet L-function. Combining Artin reciprocity with factorizations of Dedekind zeta functions, we would get that for abelian extension:

$$\zeta_L(s)=\prod_{\chi \text{ prim}}L(s,\chi_K)$$

Where index runs over primitive Hecke characters of $K$, corresponding to irreducible representations of $\text{Gal}(L/K)$. In even more special case, if $L/\mathbb{Q}$ is abelian extension, then:

$$\zeta_L(s)=\prod_{\chi \text{ prim}}L(s,\chi)$$

where $L(\chi,s)$ are Dirichlet L-functions for primitive Dirichlet characters corresponding to irreducible representations of $\text{Gal}(L/\mathbb{Q})$.

== Conjectures ==
Some properties of Artin L-functions have turned out to be very difficult to prove. Many of them are generalizations of properties displayed by special cases of these functions and are of vital importance for number theory.

=== The Artin conjecture ===
The Artin conjecture also called Artin holomorphy conjecture states that $L(s,\rho,L/K)$ for a non-trivial, irreducible representation $\rho$ is an entire function..

The assumption that the representation is non-trivial is necessary, because for the trivial representation we get the Dedekind zeta function, which has a simple pole at s = 1. The assumption that the representation is irreducible allows the statement to be simplified by excluding representations induced from the trivial representation. However, this statement is a natural generalization of the theorem that Hecke L-functions are entire for non-trivial, primitive Hecke characters.

The main problem with the holomorphy of the analytic continuation arises from the fact that the meromorphic continuation is constructed as a product of Hecke L-functions raised to integer powers: zeros of functions with negative powers produce poles that must be cancelled by zeros of functions with positive powers. A direct proof of the Artin conjecture from this construction would require very detailed knowledge of the location and multiplicities of the nontrivial zeros of Hecke L-functions, a problem that is generally very hard for L-functions.

A further improvement of Brauer’s theorem to use only positive integer coefficients is not possible in the general case: groups in which all characters can be induced from one-dimensional characters using positive integer coefficients are called monomial groups, and Taketa (1930) proved that all monomial group are solvable groups. Moreover, this is only a necessary condition: the SL(2,3) is solvable group that has the complex character of a 2-dimensional representation that cannot be expressed this way.

The Artin conjecture was solved in very specific cases:

- for one-dimensional representations conjecture follows from holomorphy of Hecke L-functions. More generally Artin, showed that the conjecture is true for all representations induced from 1-dimensional representations.
- in case of two-dimensional representations, they can be classified by the nature of the image subgroup: it may be cyclic, dihedral, tetrahedral, octahedral, or icosahedral.
  - For odd and irreducible, two-dimensional representations follows from the proof of Serre's modularity conjecture, regardless of image subgroup.
  - For the cyclic or dihedral case follows easily from Erich Hecke's work.
  - Langlands (1980) used the base change lifting to prove the tetrahedral case.
  - Tunnell (1981) extended Langlands work to cover the octahedral case.
  - The general icosahedral case is open and is active area of research.

Artin conjecture combined with factorization of Dedekind zeta function for Galois extensions implies Dedekind conjecture, that for any finite extension $L/K$ of number fields the quotient:

$$\frac{\zeta_L(s)}{\zeta_K(s)}$$

is entire function.

=== Langlands reciprocity ===
Langlands reciprocity is conjecture proposed by Robert Langlands as a generalization of Artin reciprocity to non-abelian field extensions.

Let $L/K$ be finite number field extension and $\rho$ be irreducible representation of $\text{Gal}(L/K)$. Langlands conjectured that, then exists automorphic cuspidal representation $\pi$ of general linear group $\text{GL}(n,A_K)$, where $\mathbf{A}_K$ be adele ring for $K$ satisfying:

$$L(s,\rho,L/K)=L(s,\pi)$$

where $L(s,\pi)$ is automorphic L-function for that representation. This reciprocity law was proven in very special cases and is still largely conjectural, but stands for the best proposition for development of non-abelian class field theory and solution to Hilbert's ninth problem.

Langlands (1970) pointed out that the Artin conjecture would follow from this reciprocity law and conjecture that the L-functions of cuspidal automorphic representations are entire functions. This was one of the major motivations for more much general Langlands program.

=== The Riemann Hypothesis ===
From functional equation, all nontrivial zeros for Artin L-functions are symmetric with respect to critical line $\operatorname{Re}(s)=\tfrac{1}{2}$. Riemann Hypothesis for Artin L-functions says, that they should lie on critical line. This is generalization of original Riemann hypothesis as well as its versions for Dirichlet L-functions, Hecke L-functions and Dedekind zeta functions, then it have many consequences in analytic and algebraic number theory.

Assuming Artin's conjecture it is equivalent with Riemann Hypotheses for Hecke L-functions and Dedekind zeta functions. Assuming Langlands reciprocity, it would follow from Grand Riemann hypothesis.

=== Stark conjectures ===
Using class number formula and functional equation for Dedekind zeta function we would get that order and leading coefficient of trivial zero at $s=0$ is related to some important invariants of number field:

$$\lim_{s\rightarrow 0}s^{-(r_1+r_2-1)}\zeta_K(s)=-\frac{h(K)R(K)}{w(K)}$$

where:

- $h(K)$ is class number for $K$
- $R(K)$ is regulator for $K$
- $w(K)$ is number of roots of unity in $K$
- $r_1$ is number of real places of $K$
- $r_2$ is number of non-conjugated complex places of $K$
- $r_1 + r_2-1$ is both order of zero as rank of unit group in $\mathcal{O}_K$

As a generalization of that phenomenon Stark conjectured that leading coefficient of Taylor series of Artin L-function at $s=0$ should be product of Stark regulator with some algebraic number. Stark proposed refined version of his conjecture when $L/K$ is abelian extension and order of zero of Artin L-function at $s=0$ is one. He predicted existence of Stark units whose roots should generate Kummer extensions of $K$ and having implications for Hilbert's twelfth problem.

== See also ==
- Equivariant L-function

== Bibliography ==
- Artin, E. (1923). "Über eine neue Art von L Reihen". Hamb. Math. Abh. 3. Reprinted in his collected works, ISBN 0-387-90686-X. English translation in Artin L-Functions: A Historical Approach by N. Snyder.
- Artin, Emil (1930), "Zur Theorie der L-Reihen mit allgemeinen Gruppencharakteren.", Abhandlungen aus dem Mathematischen Seminar der Universität Hamburg (in German), 8: 292–306, doi:10.1007/BF02941010, JFM 56.0173.02, S2CID 120987633
- Tunnell, Jerrold (1981). "Artin's conjecture for representations of octahedral type". Bull. Amer. Math. Soc. N. S. 5 (2): 173–175. doi:10.1090/S0273-0979-1981-14936-3.
- Gelbart, Stephen (1977). "Automorphic forms and Artin's conjecture". Modular functions of one variable, VI (Proc. Second Internat. Conf., Univ. Bonn., Bonn, 1976). Lecture Notes in Math. Vol. 627. Berlin: Springer. pp. 241–276.
- Langlands, Robert (1967). "Letter to Prof. Weil".
- Langlands, Robert P. (1970). "Problems in the theory of automorphic forms". Lectures in modern analysis and applications, III. Lecture Notes in Math. Vol. 170. Berlin, New York: Springer-Verlag. pp. 18–61. doi:10.1007/BFb0079065. ISBN 978-3-540-05284-5. MR 0302614.
- Langlands, Robert P. (1980), Base change for GL(2), Annals of Mathematics Studies, vol. 96, Princeton University Press, ISBN 978-0-691-08263-9, MR 0574808
- Martinet, J. (1977). "Character theory and Artin L-functions". In Fröhlich, A. (ed.). Algebraic Number Fields, Proc. Symp. London Math. Soc., Univ. Durham 1975. Academic Press. pp. 1–87. ISBN 0-12-268960-7. Zbl 0359.12015.
- Perlis, R. (2001) [1994], "Artin root numbers", Encyclopedia of Mathematics, EMS Press
- Prasad, Dipendra; Yogananda, C. S. (2000). "A Report on Artin's Holomorphy Conjecture". In Bambah, R. P.; Dumir, V. C.; Hans-Gill, R. J. (eds.). Number Theory (PDF). Birkhäuser Basel. pp. 301–314. doi:10.1007/978-3-0348-7023-8_16. ISBN 978-3-0348-7023-8.
- Taketa, K. (1930), "Über die Gruppen, deren Darstellungen sich sämtlich auf monomiale Gestalt transformieren lassen.", Proceedings of the Imperial Academy (in German), 6 (2): 31–33, doi:10.3792/pia/1195581421
