= Harold Stark =

American mathematician (born 1939)

Harold M. Stark
- Born: August 6, 1939 (age 87); Los Angeles, California, U.S.
- Education: California Institute of Technology (BS); University of California, Berkeley (PhD)
- Known for: Stark conjectures Stark–Heegner theorem
- Awards: American Academy of Arts and Sciences; United States National Academy of Sciences
- Scientific career
- Fields: Mathematics
- Workplaces: University of Michigan; Massachusetts Institute of Technology; University of California, San Diego
- Doctoral advisor: Derrick Henry Lehmer
- Doctoral students: Jeffrey Hoffstein; Jeffrey Lagarias; M. Ram Murty; Andrew Odlyzko

Harold Mead Stark (born August 6, 1939) is an American mathematician, specializing in number theory. He is best known for his solution of the Gauss class number 1 problem, in effect correcting and completing the earlier work of Kurt Heegner, and for Stark's conjecture. More recently, he collaborated with Audrey Terras to study zeta functions in graph theory. He is currently on the faculty of the University of California, San Diego.

Stark received his bachelor's degree from the California Institute of Technology in 1961 and his PhD from the University of California, Berkeley in 1964. He was on the faculty at the University of Michigan from 1964 to 1968, at the Massachusetts Institute of Technology from 1968 to 1980, and at the University of California, San Diego from 1980 to the present.

Stark was elected to the American Academy of Arts and Sciences in 1983 and to the United States National Academy of Sciences in 2007. In 2012, he became a fellow of the American Mathematical Society.

== Selected publications ==
- Stark, Harold M. (1978). An Introduction to Number Theory. Cambridge: MIT Press. ISBN 978-0-262-69060-7.; 1970 edition. Markham Publishing Co.

== See also ==
- Brumer–Stark conjecture
