= Kronecker–Weber theorem =

Every finite abelian extension of Q is contained within some cyclotomic field

In algebraic number theory, it can be shown that every cyclotomic field is an abelian extension of the rational number field Q, having Galois group of the form $(\mathbb Z/n\mathbb Z)^\times$. The Kronecker–Weber theorem provides a partial converse: every finite abelian extension of Q is contained within some cyclotomic field. In other words, every algebraic integer whose Galois group is abelian can be expressed as a sum of roots of unity with rational coefficients. For example,

$\sqrt{5} = e^{2 \pi i / 5} - e^{4 \pi i / 5} - e^{6 \pi i / 5} + e^{8 \pi i / 5},$ $\sqrt{-3} = e^{2 \pi i / 3} - e^{4 \pi i / 3},$ and $\sqrt{3} = e^{\pi i / 6} - e^{5 \pi i / 6}.$

The theorem is named after Leopold Kronecker and Heinrich Martin Weber.

== Field-theoretic formulation ==
The Kronecker–Weber theorem can be stated in terms of fields and field extensions. Precisely, the Kronecker–Weber theorem states: every finite abelian extension of the rational numbers Q is a subfield of a cyclotomic field. That is, whenever an algebraic number field has a Galois group over Q that is an abelian group, the field is a subfield of a field obtained by adjoining a root of unity to the rational numbers.

For a given abelian extension K of Q there is a minimal cyclotomic field that contains it. The theorem allows one to define the conductor of K as the smallest integer n such that K lies inside the field generated by the n-th roots of unity. For example, the quadratic fields have as conductor the absolute value of their discriminant, a fact generalised in class field theory.

== History ==
The theorem was first stated by Kronecker (1853) though his argument was not complete for extensions of degree a power of 2. Weber (1886) published a proof, but this had some gaps and errors that were pointed out and corrected by Neumann (1981). The first complete proof was given by Hilbert (1896).

== Generalizations ==
Lubin and Tate (1965, 1966) proved the local Kronecker–Weber theorem which states that any abelian extension of a local field can be constructed using cyclotomic extensions and Lubin–Tate extensions. Hazewinkel (1975), Rosen (1981) and Lubin (1981) gave other proofs.

Hilbert's twelfth problem asks for generalizations of the Kronecker–Weber theorem to describe abelian extensions of arbitrary number fields and asks for the analogues of the roots of unity for those fields. Currently, the generalization is proven only for CM-fields.

A different approach to abelian extensions is given by class field theory.
