= Dedekind zeta function =

Generalization of the Riemann zeta function for algebraic number fields

In mathematics, the Dedekind zeta function of an algebraic number field K, usually denoted $\zeta_K(s)$, is an analytic function that represents information about the ideals in the corresponding number ring, generalizing how the Riemann zeta function $\zeta(s)$ represents information about the factorization of integers.

The Dedekind zeta function generalizes many properties of the Riemann zeta function: it can be defined as a Dirichlet series; it has an analytic continuation to a meromorphic function on the complex plane C with only a simple pole at $s=1$; it has an Euler product expansion; and it satisfies a functional equation. Values of Dedekind zeta functions encode important arithmetic data of K.

The Dedekind zeta function is named for Richard Dedekind, who introduced it in his supplement to Peter Gustav Lejeune Dirichlet's Vorlesungen über Zahlentheorie.

== Motivation ==
Unique factorization of non-zero elements into powers of prime elements, which is a fundamental property for usual (rational) integer numbers, generally fails for the ring of integers of an arbitrary number field, which is not necessarily a principal ideal domain (PID) (although Gaussian integers and Eisenstein integers are PIDs).

However, since the ring of integers is a Dedekind ring, uniqueness does hold for non-zero ideals factored into powers of prime ideals. Thus for general number rings, prime ideals rather than prime elements are the main objects of interest. To describe the distribution of prime ideals among all ideals requires a measurement of an ideal's "size". The natural measure is the absolute norm $N$, defined as the cardinality of the quotient ring:

$$N(I)=\vert \mathcal{O}_K/I \vert .$$

For rational integers, this is equal to the non-negative integer generating the ideal.

== Definition ==
Let $K$ be an algebraic number field, with a ring of integers $\mathcal{O}_K$, and let $N$ denote absolute norm. The Dedekind zeta function of $K$ is the analytic function defined by the series:

$$\zeta_K (s) = \sum_{I \subseteq \mathcal{O}_K} \frac{1}{N(I)^{s}},$$

where the index runs over all non-zero ideals of $\mathcal{O}_K$. This definition is valid only for $s$ in the domain of convergence of this series (which can be shown to be $\operatorname{Re}(s)>1$); over the rest of the complex plane, it is defined as the analytic continuation of this series.

== Basic properties ==
=== Dirichlet series ===
The Dedekind zeta function is defined in terms of the corresponding number field, but it is easier to investigate its analytical properties by writing it as a classical Dirichlet series. Denoting by $I(n)$ the number of ideals of norm $n$, we can rewrite series in the domain of absolute convergence as:

$$\zeta_K (s) = \sum_{I \subseteq \mathcal{O}_K} \frac{1}{N(I)^{s}} = \sum_{n=1}^{\infty} \frac{I(n)}{n^s}.$$

Using Minkowski's bound and summing over all ideal classes one can show the growth bound:

$$\sum_{n\leq x}I(n) = O(x).$$

The basic properties of Dirichlet series imply that this series converges absolutely for $\text{Re}(s)>1$ and defines a holomorphic function in this domain.

=== Euler product ===
For every number field, its ring of integers is a Dedekind domain, hence every ideal can be uniquely factored into a product of prime ideals. The norm function is multiplicative with respect to multiplication of ideals, which implies that the Dedekind zeta function has an Euler product over all non-zero prime ideals in $\mathcal{O}_K$:

$$\zeta_K (s) = \prod_{\mathfrak{p} \subseteq \mathcal{O}_K} \frac{1}{1-N(\mathfrak{p})^{-s}},\text{ for Re}(s)>1.$$

Since in $\mathrm{Re}(s)>1$ this is an absolutely convergent product of non-zero elements, it follows that $\zeta_K(s) \neq 0$ in this half-plane.

=== Analytic continuation ===
Dedekind zeta functions have meromorphic continuation to complex plane with only one simple pole at $s=1$. The residue at that pole is given by the class number formula, which combines important arithmetic data involving invariants of the unit group and class group of the field $K$.

Construction of analytic continuation usually uses fact that $\zeta_K(s)$ is Hecke L-function for trivial Hecke character of $K$. Erich Hecke was first to prove analytic continuation and functional equation for Hecke L-functions in 1917, including Dedekind zeta functions. The complicated methodology used by Hecke was simplified in 1950 by John Tate in his doctoral thesis.

=== Functional equation ===
The Dedekind zeta function satisfies a functional equation relating its values at $s$ and $1-s$, generalizing the equation satisfied by the Riemann zeta function. The functional equation involves important invariants of number field. Let:

- $\Delta_K$ denote the discriminant of $K$,
- $r_1$ denote the number of real places (embeddings) of $K$,
- $r_2$ denote the number of conjugate pairs of complex places of $K$ so that $[K:\Q] = r_1+2r_2$.

In terms of the gamma function $\Gamma(s)$, define real and complex gamma factors as:

$$\Gamma_\mathbf{R}(s)=\pi^{-s/2}\Gamma(s/2), \qquad \Gamma_\mathbf{C}(s)=
(2\pi)^{-s}\Gamma(s).$$

Then, the function:

$$\Lambda_K(s)=\left|\Delta_K\right|^{s/2}\Gamma_\mathbf{R}(s)^{r_1}\Gamma_\mathbf{C}(s)^{r_2}\zeta_K(s)$$

satisfies the functional equation:

$$\Lambda_K(s)=\Lambda_K(1-s)$$

The functional equation for the Dedekind zeta function implies a set of trivial zeroes which cancel poles of the gamma factors in the equation; while nontrivial zeroes are common zeros of $\zeta_K$ and $\Lambda_K$. The functional equation and Euler product show that nontrivial zeros must lie in the vertical strip $0\leq \operatorname{Re}(s)\leq 1$, and are symmetric with respect to the critical line $\operatorname{Re}(s)=\tfrac{1}{2}$.

In analogy to the $\Xi$ function defined from the Riemann zeta function, one can define:

$$\Xi_K(s)=-\tfrac12(s^2+\tfrac14)\Lambda_K(\tfrac12+is)$$,

which removes the poles of $\Lambda_K$, producing an entire function, and moves the critical line to the real line. The functional equation simplifies to:

$$\Xi_K(\overline{s})=\overline{\Xi_K(s)}.$$

== Special values ==
As for the Riemann zeta function, the values of the Dedekind zeta function at integers (or related quantities like the residue, the multiplicities of zeroes, or the leading coefficient in the Taylor expansion at zero) may encode important arithmetic data of the field K, at least conjecturally. Let:

- $\Delta_K$ be the absolute discriminant of $K$,
- $r_1$ be the number of real places of $K$,
- $r_2$ be the number of conjugate pairs of complex places of $K$,
- $h(K)$ be the ideal class number of $K$,
- $R(K)$ be the regulator of $K$,
- $w(K)$ be the number of roots of unity in $K$.

Dedekind's class number formula relates the residue of $\zeta_K(s)$ at its unique pole $s=1$ to this data:

$$\lim_{s \rightarrow 1}(s-1)\zeta_K(s)=\frac{2^{r_1}(2\pi)^{r_2}h(K)R(K)}{w(K)\sqrt{\Delta_K}}$$

From the functional equation one can deduce that $\zeta_K(s)$ has trivial zeros of multiplicity $r_1+r_2$ at non-zero (even negative) integers and of multiplicity $r_2$ at odd negative integers. At zero, $\zeta_K(s)$ has a trivial zero of multiplicity $r_1+r_2-1$, which equals the rank of the group of units in $\mathcal{O}_K$. Combining the class number formula with the functional equation implies that at $s=0$, the leading term at this point is:

$$\lim_{s\rightarrow 0}s^{-(r_1+r_2-1)}\zeta_K(s)=-\frac{h(K)R(K)}{w(K)}$$.

The function is non-vanishing at odd negative numbers $s$ only when $K$ is a totally real number field, in which case Siegel showed that $\zeta_K(s)$ is a non-zero rational number.

=== Arithmetically equivalent fields ===
Two fields are called arithmetically equivalent if they have the same Dedekind zeta function. Such pairs are useful as counterexamples to show which arithmetic invariants cannot be determined by any features of the Dedekind zeta function.

Perlis (1977) showed that two number fields K and L are arithmetically equivalent if and only if all but finitely many prime numbers p have the same inertia degrees in the two fields, i.e., if $\mathfrak p_i$ are the prime ideals in K lying over p, then the tuples $([\mathcal O_K / \mathfrak p_i:\mathbb{F}_p])$ need to be the same for K and for L for almost all p.

Bosma & de Smit (2002) used Gassmann triples to give some examples of pairs of non-isomorphic fields that are arithmetically equivalent. Since some of these pairs have different class numbers, the Dedekind zeta function of a number field cannot determine its class number $h(K)$, only the composite quantity ${h(K)R(K)}/{w(K)}$.

== Relations to other L-functions and zeta functions ==
=== Special cases ===
For the special case $K=\mathbb{Q}$, the Dedekind zeta function is equal to the Riemann zeta function, the classical prototype for all zeta functions and L-functions.

=== More general zeta functions ===
The Dedekind zeta function is a special case of an arithmetic zeta function and of a Hasse–Weil zeta function for the scheme $\text{Spec }\mathcal{O}_K$. It is also the motivic L-function of the motive coming from the cohomology of $\text{Spec }\mathcal{O}_K$.

=== Artin L-functions ===
Although Artin L-functions are attached to number field extensions and Galois representations rather than to individual number fields, Dedekind zeta functions are a special case of these. For any finite number field extension $L/K$ and the trivial representation $\mathcal{1}$ of its Galois group $\text{Gal}(L/K)$, the resulting Artin L-function is:

$$L(s,\mathcal{1},L/K)=\zeta_K(s).$$

Artin L-functions are very useful for providing non-trivial factorizations for Dedekind zeta functions. If $L/K$ is a finite Galois extension, then the Dedekind zeta function of the larger field is the Artin L-function for the regular representation $\mathrm{reg}$ of $\text{Gal}(L/K)$, and has a factorization into L-functions of irreducible representations of this group:

$$\zeta_L(s) = L(s,\mathrm{reg},L/K) = \prod_{\rho \text{ irr}} L(s,\rho,L/K)^{\deg(\rho)}$$

Without the assumption that the extension is Galois, the formula becomes more complicated, but is also possible to obtain a similar factorization using the normal closure of the larger field and induced representations. Let:

- $M$ be the normal closure of $L/K$,
- $H$ be the Galois group $\mathrm{Gal}(M/L)$,
- $G$ be Galois group for $\mathrm{Gal}(M/K)$,
- $\langle \cdot ,\cdot \rangle$ be the inner product on characters of representations,
- $\chi_\rho$ be the character of irreducible representation $\rho$ ,
- $\text{Ind}_{H}^{G}(\rho)$ be the representation induced from $\rho$,
- $\chi^*$ be the character of $\text{Ind}_{H}^{G}(\mathbb{1})$.

Then the factorization of the Dedekind zeta function is as follows:

$$\zeta_L(s)=\prod_{\rho \text{ irr}}L(s,\text{Ind}_{H}^{G}(\rho),M/K)^{\langle \chi_\rho,\chi^*\rangle}$$

=== Hecke L-functions ===
In the special case where $L/K$ is an abelian extension, Artin reciprocity allows the factorization to be described in terms of Hecke L-functions:

$$\zeta_L(s) = \prod_{\chi \text{ prim}} L(s,\chi),$$

where the index runs over primitive Hecke characters corresponding to irreducible representations of the abelian Galois group.

=== Dirichlet L-functions ===
Taking the even more special case when $L/\mathbb{Q}$ is an abelian extension, the Hecke characters become Dirichlet characters and Hecke L-functions become Dirichlet L-functions.

In the simple example of a quadratic field K, an abelian extension of the rational numbers, this becomes:

$$\zeta_K(s) = \zeta(s)\cdot L(s,\chi).$$

In this case, $\chi$ is a Jacobi symbol used as a Dirichlet character. This fact—that the zeta function of a quadratic field is a product of the Riemann zeta function and the Dirichlet L-function with Jacobi symbol—is an analytic formulation of the quadratic reciprocity law.

== Conjectures ==
=== Dedekind conjecture ===
Dedekind conjectured that for every number field function,

$$\frac{\zeta_K(s)}{\zeta(s)}$$

is an entire function. The more general version of the Dedekind conjecture says that for every finite extension $L/K$ of number field, the quotient

$$\frac{\zeta_L(s)}{\zeta_K(s)}$$

is an entire function. For abelian extensions, the Dedekind conjecture follows from factorization into Hecke L-functions and fact that Hecke L-functions for nontrivial characters are entire. For general Galois extensions, this follows from the Aramata–Brauer theorem. For extensions which are contained in solvable extensions, it was proven independently by Uchida (1975) and van der Waall (1975).

The general case is still open, but follows directly from more general conjectures like the Artin conjecture or the Selberg orthonormality conjecture.

=== Extended Riemann hypothesis ===
The functional equation allows one to distinguish trivial and non-trivial zeros of Dedekind zeta functions, and guarantees that nontrivial zeroes lie in the vertical strip: $0<\operatorname{Re}(s)<1$ and are symmetric with respect to the critical line $\operatorname{Re}(s)=\tfrac{1}{2}$. The extended Riemann hypothesis (ERH) says that all nontrivial zeros of Dedekind zeta functions lie on the critical line, generalizing the classical Riemann hypothesis for $\zeta(s)$. The generalized Riemann hypothesis for Dirichlet L-functions is a special case of the ERH for $K$, an abelian extension of the rational numbers.

Many results in analytic number theory and algebraic number theory follow from this conjecture.

=== Values at negative integers ===
There are attempts to generalize the relation between Bernoulli numbers and values of the Riemann zeta function at negative odd integers:

$$\zeta(-n)=-\frac{B_{n+1}}{n+1}.$$

Siegel showed that for a totally real field, these values of $\zeta_K(s)$ are nonzero rational numbers. Stephen Lichtenbaum conjectured specific values for these rational numbers in terms of the algebraic K-theory of K.
