= Abelian extension =

Galois extension whose Galois group is abelian

In algebraic number theory, an abelian extension is a Galois extension whose Galois group is abelian. When the Galois group is also cyclic, the extension is also called a cyclic extension. Going in the other direction, a Galois extension is called solvable if its Galois group is solvable, i.e., if the group can be decomposed into a series of normal extensions of an abelian group. Every finite extension of a finite field is a cyclic extension.

== Description ==
Class field theory provides detailed information about the abelian extensions of number fields, function fields of algebraic curves over finite fields, and local fields.

There are two slightly different definitions of the term cyclotomic extension. It can mean either an extension formed by adjoining roots of unity to a field, or a subextension of such an extension. The cyclotomic fields are examples. A cyclotomic extension, under either definition, is always abelian.

If a field K contains a primitive n-th root of unity and the n-th root of an element of K is adjoined, the resulting Kummer extension is an abelian extension (if K has characteristic p we should say that p doesn't divide n, since otherwise this can fail even to be a separable extension). In general, however, the Galois groups of n-th roots of elements operate both on the n-th roots and on the roots of unity, giving a non-abelian Galois group as semi-direct product. Kummer theory gives a complete description of the abelian extension case, and the Kronecker–Weber theorem tells us that if K is the field of rational numbers, an extension is abelian if and only if it is a subfield of a field obtained by adjoining a root of unity.

There is an important analogy with the fundamental group in topology, which classifies all covering spaces of a space: abelian covers are classified by its abelianisation which relates directly to the first homology group.
