= Basic Number Theory =

Book about number theory

- Author: André Weil
- Genre: Mathematics
- Publication date: 1974
- ISBN: 978-3-540-58655-5

Basic Number Theory is an influential book by André Weil, an exposition of algebraic number theory and class field theory with particular emphasis on valuation-theoretic methods. Based in part on a course taught at Princeton University in 1961–62, it appeared as Volume 144 in Springer's Grundlehren der mathematischen Wissenschaften series. The approach handles all 'A-fields' or global fields, meaning finite algebraic extensions of the field of rational numbers and of the field of rational functions of one variable with a finite field of constants. The theory is developed in a uniform way, starting with topological fields, properties of Haar measure on locally compact fields, the main theorems of adelic and idelic number theory, and class field theory via the theory of simple algebras over local and global fields. The word `basic’ in the title is closer in meaning to `foundational’ rather than `elementary’, and is perhaps best interpreted as meaning that the material developed is foundational for the development of the theories of automorphic forms, representation theory of algebraic groups, and more advanced topics in algebraic number theory. The style is austere, with a narrow concentration on a logically coherent development of the theory required, and essentially no examples.

== Mathematical context and purpose ==
In the foreword, the author explains that instead of the “futile and impossible task” of improving on Hecke's classical treatment of algebraic number theory, he “rather tried to draw the conclusions from the developments of the last thirty years, whereby locally compact groups, measure and integration have been seen to play an increasingly important role in classical number theory”. Weil goes on to explain a viewpoint that grew from work of Hensel, Hasse, Chevalley, Artin, Iwasawa, Tate, and Tamagawa in which the real numbers may be seen as but one of infinitely many different completions of the rationals, with no logical reason to favour it over the various p-adic completions. In this setting, the adeles (or valuation vectors) give a natural locally compact ring in which all the valuations are brought together in a single coherent way in which they “cooperate for a common purpose”. Removing the real numbers from a pedestal and placing them alongside the p-adic numbers leads naturally – “it goes without saying” to the development of the theory of function fields over finite fields in a “fully simultaneous treatment with number-fields”. In a striking choice of wording for a foreword written in the United States in 1967, the author chooses to drive this particular viewpoint home by explaining that the two classes of global fields “must be granted a fully simultaneous treatment […] instead of the segregated status, and at best the separate but equal facilities, which hitherto have been their lot. That, far from losing by such treatment, both races stand to gain by it, is one fact which will, I hope, clearly emerge from this book.”

After World War II, a series of developments in class field theory diminished the significance of the cyclic algebras (and, more generally, the crossed product algebras) which are defined in terms of the number field in proofs of class field theory. Instead cohomological formalism became a more significant part of local and global class field theory, particularly in work of Hochschild and Nakayama, Weil, Artin, and Tate during the period 1950–1952.

Alongside the desire to consider algebraic number fields alongside function fields over finite fields, the work of Chevalley is particularly emphasised. In order to derive the theorems of global class field theory from those of local class field theory, Chevalley introduced what he called the élément idéal, later called idèle, at Hasse's suggestion. The idèle group of a number field was first introduced by Chevalley in order to describe global class field theory for infinite extensions, but several years later he used it in a new way to derive global class field theory from local class field theory. Weil mentioned this (unpublished) work as a significant influence on some of the choices of treatment he uses.

== Reception ==
The 1st edition was reviewed by George Whaples for Mathematical Reviews and Helmut Koch for Zentralblatt. Later editions were reviewed by Fernando Q. Gouvêa for the Mathematical Association of America and by Koch for Zentralblatt; in his review of the second edition Koch makes the remark "Shafarevich showed me the first edition in autumn 1967 in Moscow and said that this book will be from now on the book about class field theory". The coherence of the treatment, and some of its distinctive features, were highlighted by several reviewers, with Koch going on to say "This book is written in the spirit of the early forties and just this makes it a valuable source of information for everyone who is working about problems related to number and function fields."

== Contents ==
Roughly speaking, the first half of the book is modern in its consistent use of adelic and idèlic methods and the simultaneous treatment of algebraic number fields and rational function fields over finite fields. The second half is arguably pre-modern in its development of simple algebras and class field theory without the language of cohomology, and without the language of Galois cohomology in particular. The author acknowledges this as a trade-off, explaining that “to develop such an approach systematically would have meant loading a great deal of unnecessary machinery on a ship which seemed well equipped for this particular voyage; instead of making it more seaworthy, it might have sunk it.” The treatment of class field theory uses analytic methods on both commutative fields and simple algebras. These methods show their power in giving the first unified proof that if K/k is a finite normal extension of A-fields, then any automorphism of K over k is induced by the Frobenius automorphism for infinitely many places of K. This approach also allows for a significantly simpler and more logical proof of algebraic statements, for example the result that a simple algebra over an A-field splits (globally) if and only if it splits everywhere locally. The systematic use of simple algebras also simplifies the treatment of local class field theory. For instance, it is more straightforward to prove that a simple algebra over a local field has an unramified splitting field than to prove the corresponding statement for 2-cohomology classes.

=== Chapter I ===
The book begins with Witt’s formulation of Wedderburn’s proof that a finite division ring is commutative ('Wedderburn's little theorem'). Properties of Haar measure are used to prove that `local fields’ (commutative fields locally compact under a non-discrete topology) are completions of A-fields. In particular – a concept developed later – they are precisely the fields whose local class field theory is needed for the global theory. The non-discrete non-commutative locally compact fields are then division algebras of finite dimension over a local field.

=== Chapter II ===
Finite-dimensional vector spaces over local fields and division algebras under the topology uniquely determined by the field's topology are studied, and lattices are defined topologically, an analogue of Minkowski's theorem is proved in this context, and the main theorems about character groups of these vector spaces, which in the commutative one-dimensional case reduces to `self duality’ for local fields, are shown.

=== Chapter III ===
Tensor products are used to study extensions of the places of an A-field to places of a finite separable extension of the field, with the more complicated inseparable case postponed to later.

=== Chapter IV ===
This chapter introduces the topological adele ring and idèle group of an A-field, and proves the `main theorems’ as follows:

- both the adele ring and the idèle group are locally compact;
- the A-field, when embedded diagonally, is a discrete and co-compact subring of its adele ring;
- the adele ring is self dual, meaning that it is topologically isomorphic to its Pontryagin dual, with similar properties for finite-dimensional vector spaces and algebras over local fields.

The chapter ends with a generalized unit theorem for A-fields, describing the units in valuation terms.

=== Chapter V ===
This chapter departs slightly from the simultaneous treatment of number fields and function fields. In the number field setting, lattices (that is, fractional ideals) are defined, and the Haar measure volume of a fundamental domain for a lattice is found. This is used to study the discriminant of an extension.

=== Chapter VI ===
This chapter is focused on the function field case; the Riemann-Roch theorem is stated and proved in measure-theoretic language, with the canonical class defined as the class of divisors of non-trivial characters of the adele ring which are trivial on the embedded field.

=== Chapter VII ===
The zeta and L-functions (and similar analytic objects) for an A-field are expressed in terms of integrals over the idèle group. Decomposing these integrals into products over all valuations and using Fourier transforms gives rise to meromorphic continuations and functional equations. This gives, for example, analytic continuation of the Dedekind zeta-function to the whole plane, along with its functional equation. The treatment here goes back ultimately to a suggestion of Artin, and was developed in Tate's thesis.

=== Chapter VIII ===
Formulas for local and global different and discriminants, ramification theory, and the formula for the genus of an algebraic extension of a function field are developed.

=== Chapter IX ===
A brief treatment of simple algebras is given, including explicit rules for cyclic factor sets.

=== Chapters X and XI ===
The zeta-function of a simple algebra over an A-field is defined, and used to prove further results on the norm group and groupoid of maximal ideals in a simple algebra over an A-field.

=== Chapter XII ===
The reciprocity law of local class field theory over a local field in the context of a pairing of the multiplicative group of a field and the character group of the absolute Galois group of the algebraic closure of the field is proved. Ramification theory for abelian extensions is developed.

=== Chapter XIII ===
The global class field theory for A-fields is developed using the pairings of Chapter XII, replacing multiplicative groups of local fields with idèle class groups of A-fields. The pairing is constructed as a product over places of local Hasse invariants.

=== Third edition ===
Some references are added, some minor corrections made, some comments added, and five appendices are included, containing the following material:

- A character version of the (local) transfer theorem and its extension to the global transfer theorem.
- Šafarevič's theorem on the structure of Galois groups of local fields using the theory of Weil groups.
- Theorems of Tate and Sen on the Herbrand distribution.
- Examples of L-functions with Grössencharacter.

== Editions ==
- Weil, André (1974). Basic Number Theory. Berlin, Heidelberg: Springer Berlin Heidelberg. doi:10.1007/978-3-642-61945-8. ISBN 978-3-540-58655-5.
