= Idele group =

Concept in number theory

In number theory, the idele group is a way of packaging the multiplicative arithmetic of a global field at all of its completions at once, so that it contains the information of unique factorization as well as the data relating to units. Formally, the idele group of a global field $K$ is the restricted direct product $\mathbb A_K^\times = \prod_v' K_v^\times$ of the multiplicative groups of the completions of $K$, taken with respect to the unit groups $\mathcal O_v^\times$ at the non-archimedean places. Equivalently, it is the group of invertible elements of the adele ring $\mathbb A_K$, equipped with a topology finer than the subspace topology inherited from $\mathbb A_K$.

The quotient $C_K=\mathbb A_K^\times/K^\times$ is the idele class group. Ideles and idele class groups are used in class field theory. They were exploited by John Tate in his thesis to formulate global zeta and $L$-functions and Hecke characters.

== Definition ==
Let $K$ be a global field, and let $v$ run over the places of $K$. For each place $v$, let $K_v$ denote the completion of $K$ at $v$. If $v$ is non-archimedean, let $\mathcal O_v$ be the corresponding valuation ring and let $\mathcal O_v^\times$ be its group of units.

The idele group of $K$, usually denoted $\mathbb A_K^\times$ or $I_K$, is the restricted product

$$\mathbb A_K^\times
=
\prod_v' K_v^\times$$

of the groups $K_v^\times$, taken with respect to the subgroups $\mathcal O_v^\times$ at the non-archimedean places. Thus an idele is a family

$$x=(x_v)_v,\qquad x_v\in K_v^\times,$$

such that

$$x_v\in \mathcal O_v^\times$$

for all but finitely many non-archimedean places $v$. Multiplication is defined componentwise.

Equivalently, the idele group is the group of invertible elements of the adele ring $\mathbb A_K$. However, its topology is not the subspace topology inherited from $\mathbb A_K$; it is the restricted product topology, or equivalently the topology induced by the embedding

$$\mathbb A_K^\times \longrightarrow \mathbb A_K \times \mathbb A_K,\qquad
x\mapsto (x,x^{-1}).$$

The multiplicative group $K^\times$ embeds diagonally in $\mathbb A_K^\times$. The quotient

$$C_K=\mathbb A_K^\times/K^\times$$

is called the idele class group of $K$.

== Motivation ==
The idele group may be viewed as a topological refinement of the group of fractional ideals of a number field. If $K$ is a number field with ring of integers $\mathcal O_K$, every nonzero fractional ideal has a unique factorization

$$\mathfrak a=\prod_{\mathfrak p}\mathfrak p^{n_{\mathfrak p}},$$

where $\mathfrak p$ runs over the nonzero prime ideals of $\mathcal O_K$ and all but finitely many integers $n_{\mathfrak p}$ are zero. Thus the group of fractional ideals records, for each finite place of $K$, an integral valuation.

An idele records similar local valuation data, but with additional local information. For an idele $x=(x_v)_v$, the component $x_{\mathfrak p}\in K_{\mathfrak p}^{\times}$ at a finite place determines an integer $v_{\mathfrak p}(x_{\mathfrak p})$. Since $x_{\mathfrak p}$ is a unit for all but finitely many $\mathfrak p$, these integers define a fractional ideal

$$(x)_{\mathrm{fin}}=\prod_{\mathfrak p}\mathfrak p^{v_{\mathfrak p}(x_{\mathfrak p})}.$$

This gives a surjective homomorphism from the idele group to the group of fractional ideals. The diagonal embedding $K^\times\hookrightarrow \mathbb A_K^\times$ sends an element $a\in K^\times$ to the principal idele whose associated fractional ideal is the principal ideal $(a)$. Consequently, passing to quotients gives a natural surjection

$$\mathbb A_K^\times/K^\times \longrightarrow \operatorname{Cl}(K),$$

from the idele class group to the ordinary ideal class group.

Thus the idele class group enlarges the ideal class group. It extends the finite-prime data measured by fractional ideals with the unit groups at finite places and the multiplicative groups at the archimedean places. This additional topological information is important in class field theory and in the theory of Hecke characters, where characters of the idele class group replace characters defined only on ideal class groups or ray class groups.

== Topology and Haar measure ==
Although the idele group $\mathbb A_K^\times$ is the group of invertible elements of the adele ring $\mathbb A_K$, it is not usually equipped with the subspace topology inherited from $\mathbb A_K$. With the subspace topology, inversion need not be continuous. Instead, $\mathbb A_K^\times$ is given the restricted product topology

$$\mathbb A_K^\times=\prod_v' K_v^\times,$$

where the restricted product is taken with respect to the compact open subgroups $\mathcal O_v^\times$ at the non-archimedean places. A basis of open neighbourhoods of the identity is given by products

$$\prod_v U_v,$$

where $U_v$ is an open neighbourhood of $1$ in $K_v^\times$ and $U_v=\mathcal O_v^\times$ for all but finitely many non-archimedean places $v$. Equivalently, this is the topology induced by the embedding

$$\mathbb A_K^\times \longrightarrow \mathbb A_K\times \mathbb A_K,\qquad
x\mapsto (x,x^{-1}).$$

With this topology, $\mathbb A_K^\times$ is a locally compact topological group.

Since the idele group is locally compact, it has a Haar measure, usually denoted $d^\times x$. This measure is obtained as a product of local multiplicative Haar measures on the groups $K_v^\times$. At a non-archimedean place $v$, the local measure is commonly normalized so that

$$\operatorname{vol}(\mathcal O_v^\times)=1.$$

At the real place, a standard multiplicative Haar measure on $\mathbb R^\times$ is

$$d^\times x=\frac{dx}{|x|},$$

up to multiplication by a positive constant; analogous normalizations are used at complex places. These local choices combine to give a multiplicative Haar measure on $\mathbb A_K^\times$. Such measures are used in harmonic analysis on the ideles, especially in Tate's thesis and in the analytic theory of Hecke $L$-functions.

== Norm map and norm-one ideles ==
The idele group carries a homomorphism, usually called the idele norm or module into the positive reals. Choose the standard normalized absolute value $|\cdot|_v$ on each completion $K_v$: for a non-archimedean place $v$, it is normalized so that
$$|\varpi_v|_v=q_v^{-1},$$
where $\varpi_v$ is a uniformizer and $q_v$ is the size of the residue field. At the archimedean places one uses the usual normalized absolute values, with the complex absolute value taken squared. For an idele $x=(x_v)_v$, define
$$|x|_{\mathbb A}=\prod_v |x_v|_v.$$

This product is finite, since $x_v\in\mathcal O_v^\times$ for all but finitely many non-archimedean places, and hence $|x_v|_v=1$ for all but finitely many $v$. Thus
$$|\cdot|_{\mathbb A}:\mathbb A_K^\times\to \mathbb R_{>0}$$
is a continuous group homomorphism.

The norm-one ideles are the elements in the kernel of this homomorphism:
$$\mathbb A_K^1=\{x\in\mathbb A_K^\times: |x|_{\mathbb A}=1\}.$$

By the product formula for global fields, every element of $K^\times$, embedded diagonally in $\mathbb A_K^\times$, has idele norm one. Hence

$$K^\times\subset \mathbb A_K^1.$$

The quotient
$$C_K^1=\mathbb A_K^1/K^\times$$
is called the group of norm-one idele classes. It is a compact group.

The idele norm descends to a homomorphism on the idele class group,
$$|\cdot|_{\mathbb A}:C_K=\mathbb A_K^\times/K^\times\to \mathbb R_{>0},$$
whose kernel is $C_K^1$. For number fields this gives an exact sequence
$$1\longrightarrow C_K^1\longrightarrow C_K
\xrightarrow{|\cdot|_{\mathbb A}} \mathbb R_{>0}\longrightarrow 1.$$

Thus the idele class group is not compact in the number field case, but its norm-one subgroup modulo $K^\times$ is compact. This compactness is one of the idelic forms of the finiteness of the ideal class group together with the structure theorem for units.

For number fields, the idele norm is surjective onto $\mathbb R_{>0}$, and the above exact sequence splits after choosing a positive archimedean component. Thus $C_K$ is, non-canonically or after such a choice, a product of the compact group $C_K^1$ with $\mathbb R_{>0}$. For global function fields, the image of the idele norm is instead a discrete subgroup of $\mathbb R_{>0}$, so the corresponding quotient is discrete and isomorphic to an infinite cyclic group.

== Norms for field extensions ==
Let $L/K$ be a finite extension of global fields. For each place $v$ of $K$ and each place $w$ of $L$ lying above $v$, there is a local norm map

$$N_{L_w/K_v}:L_w^\times\longrightarrow K_v^\times .$$

These local norm maps combine to give a continuous homomorphism on idele groups

$$N_{L/K}:\mathbb A_L^\times\longrightarrow \mathbb A_K^\times .$$

If $y=(y_w)_w\in \mathbb A_L^\times$, then the $v$-component of $N_{L/K}(y)$ is

$$\left(N_{L/K}(y)\right)_v
=
\prod_{w\mid v} N_{L_w/K_v}(y_w).$$

This product is finite for each fixed $v$. Moreover, for all but finitely many non-archimedean places $w$, the component $y_w$ lies in $\mathcal O_w^\times$, and its local norm lies in $\mathcal O_v^\times$. Hence $N_{L/K}(y)$ is again an idele of $K$. The continuity follows from the continuity of the local norm maps and from the restricted product topology.

The norm map is compatible with principal ideles. If $a\in L^\times$ is embedded diagonally in $\mathbb A_L^\times$, then

$$N_{L/K}(a)$$

is the principal idele of $K$ associated with the field norm $N_{L/K}(a)\in K^\times$. Consequently, the idele norm descends to a continuous homomorphism on idele class groups,

$$N_{L/K}:C_L\longrightarrow C_K,$$

where $C_L=\mathbb A_L^\times/L^\times$ and $C_K=\mathbb A_K^\times/K^\times$.

The embedding of $K$ into $L$ also gives a natural homomorphism

$$\mathbb A_K^\times\longrightarrow \mathbb A_L^\times .$$

Explicitly, an idele $x=(x_v)_v$ of $K$ is sent to the idele whose component at $w\mid v$ is the image of $x_v$ in $L_w^\times$. Under this embedding,

$$N_{L/K}(x)=x^{[L:K]},$$

where the power is taken componentwise. This follows from the identity

$$\prod_{w\mid v} N_{L_w/K_v}(x_v)
=
x_v^{\sum_{w\mid v}[L_w:K_v]}
=
x_v^{[L:K]}.$$

The field-extension norm should be distinguished from the idele norm or module $|x|_{\mathbb A}$. They are nevertheless compatible: with the standard normalized absolute values,

$$|N_{L/K}(y)|_{\mathbb A_K}
=
|y|_{\mathbb A_L}.$$

In particular, $N_{L/K}$ maps the norm-one idele group $\mathbb A_L^1$ into $\mathbb A_K^1$ and induces a homomorphism

$$C_L^1\longrightarrow C_K^1.$$

In global class field theory, the image $N_{L/K}(C_L)$ is called the norm subgroup of $C_K$. For a finite abelian extension $L/K$, the global Artin reciprocity map identifies the quotient

$$C_K/N_{L/K}(C_L)$$

with the Galois group $\operatorname{Gal}(L/K)$, up to the usual convention concerning arithmetic or geometric Frobenius.

== Example: the rational numbers ==
For $K=\mathbb Q$, the finite adele ring is

$$\mathbb A_{\mathbb Q,\mathrm{fin}}
=
\prod_p' \mathbb Q_p,$$

and the finite integral adeles are

$$\widehat{\mathbb Z}=\prod_p \mathbb Z_p.$$

The finite ideles are

$$\mathbb A_{\mathbb Q,\mathrm{fin}}^\times
=
\prod_p' \mathbb Q_p^\times,$$

where the restricted product is taken with respect to $\mathbb Z_p^\times$. The idele group of $\mathbb Q$ is

$$\mathbb A_{\mathbb Q}^\times
=
\mathbb A_{\mathbb Q,\mathrm{fin}}^\times
\times
\mathbb R^\times .$$

Every idele class has a representative of the form

$$(u,t)\in \widehat{\mathbb Z}^{\times}\times \mathbb R_{>0}.$$

Indeed, multiplying by a rational number changes the finite valuations and can be used to make all finite components $p$-adic units; the remaining positive real factor records the idele norm. Thus

$$\mathbb A_{\mathbb Q}^\times/\mathbb Q^\times
\cong
\widehat{\mathbb Z}^{\times}\times \mathbb R_{>0}.$$

Similarly, the norm-one idele classes are

$$\mathbb A_{\mathbb Q}^{1}/\mathbb Q^\times
\cong
\widehat{\mathbb Z}^{\times}.$$

This reflects the fact that $\mathbb Q$ has trivial ideal class group: the remaining finite part of the idele class group comes from the local unit groups $\mathbb Z_p^\times$.

== Class field theory ==
The idele class group yields a formulation of class field theory. Global class field theory describes the abelian extensions of a global field $K$ in terms of topological quotients of $C_K=\mathbb A_K^\times/K^\times.$

The main result is the global Artin reciprocity law. In one formulation, for every finite abelian extension $L/K$ there is a canonical reciprocity homomorphism
$$\theta_{L/K}: C_K \longrightarrow \operatorname{Gal}(L/K),$$
whose kernel is the norm subgroup $N_{L/K}(C_L)\subset C_K.$

The reciprocity homomorphism induces an isomorphism
$$C_K/N_{L/K}(C_L)\cong \operatorname{Gal}(L/K),$$
up to a conventional choice of arithmetic or geometric Frobenius automorphism.

Thus, finite abelian extensions of $K$ correspond to open subgroups of finite index in the idele class group. Under this correspondence, an extension $L/K$ is associated with the subgroup $N_{L/K}(C_L)$. This replaces the older formulation of class field theory in terms of ideal class groups, ray class groups, and congruence conditions by a topological statement about quotients of $C_K$.

The idelic formulation also incorporates the local reciprocity maps of local class field theory: for each place $v$ of $K$, local class field theory relates $K_v^\times$ to the abelianized Galois group of $K_v$. The global reciprocity map is compatible with these local maps through the embedding of each local multiplicative group into the idele group. At an unramified finite place, a uniformizer maps to a Frobenius element, with the precise inverse depending on the convention used for the Artin map.

Classical ideal-theoretic class field theory is then a special case. Quotients of the idele class group by certain subgroups recover ray class groups, and the corresponding abelian extensions are the ray class fields. In particular, the Hilbert class field is obtained from the quotient associated with the ordinary ideal class group, packaging the relation between ideles, fractional ideals, and ideal classes.

For the maximal abelian extension $K^{\mathrm{ab}}$, the finite-level reciprocity maps are compatible as $L$ varies over finite abelian extensions of $K$. They combine into a global reciprocity map from the idele class group to $\operatorname{Gal}(K^{\mathrm{ab}}/K)$. Thus the abelianized absolute Galois group of $K$ is described by the system of finite quotients of the idele class group.

== Hecke characters and L-functions ==
A Hecke character of a global field $K$ can be described as a continuous homomorphism

$$\chi:\mathbb A_K^\times/K^\times \to \mathbb C^\times,$$

or equivalently as a continuous character of the idele group $\mathbb A_K^\times$ that is trivial on the diagonally embedded subgroup $K^\times$. Such characters are the automorphic characters of $\operatorname{GL}_1(\mathbb A_K)$.

Writing an idele as $x=(x_v)_v$, a Hecke character decomposes into local characters

$$\chi_v:K_v^\times\to \mathbb C^\times,$$

with

$$\chi(x)=\prod_v \chi_v(x_v).$$

For all but finitely many non-archimedean places $v$, the local character $\chi_v$ is unramified, meaning that it is trivial on $\mathcal O_v^\times$. At such a place its value is determined by $\chi_v(\varpi_v)$, where $\varpi_v$ is a uniformizer of $K_v$.

Associated to a Hecke character is a global $L$-function, defined for suitable $s$ by an Euler product

$$L(s,\chi)=\prod_v L_v(s,\chi_v).$$

At an unramified non-archimedean place $v$, the local factor has the form

$$L_v(s,\chi_v)=\left(1-\chi_v(\varpi_v)q_v^{-s}\right)^{-1},$$

where $q_v$ is the size of the residue field. The remaining finitely many finite places give ramified local factors, and the archimedean places contribute gamma factors. These local factors combine to form the completed Hecke $L$-function.

Classical Dirichlet characters and ideal class characters occur as special cases. For example, over $\mathbb Q$, Dirichlet characters can be interpreted as finite-order Hecke characters with prescribed finite conductors. More generally, ray class characters of a number field can be realized as finite-order characters of quotients of the idele class group.

Hecke $L$-functions are among the basic examples of automorphic $L$-functions. In Tate's thesis, the analytic continuation and functional equation of these $L$-functions are obtained by harmonic analysis on the adele ring and the idele group. This approach recovers the analytic theory of Dirichlet $L$-functions and Hecke's original $L$-series, while also explaining their local-global factorization in terms of the product structure of the ideles.

== Relation with the ideal class group ==
For a number field $K$, the idele group refines the ordinary ideal-theoretic arithmetic of $K$. Let $\mathcal O_K$ be the ring of integers of $K$, let $J_K$ be the group of nonzero fractional ideals of $K$, and let

$$\widehat{\mathcal O}_K=\prod_{\mathfrak p}\mathcal O_{\mathfrak p}$$

be the profinite completion of $\mathcal O_K$, where $\mathfrak p$ runs over the nonzero prime ideals of $\mathcal O_K$. Its group of units is

$$\widehat{\mathcal O}_K^\times=\prod_{\mathfrak p}\mathcal O_{\mathfrak p}^{\times}.$$

Let $I_{K,\mathrm{fin}}$ denote the finite idele group,

$$I_{K,\mathrm{fin}}=\prod_{\mathfrak p}' K_{\mathfrak p}^{\times}.$$

There is a natural surjective homomorphism

$$I_{K,\mathrm{fin}}\longrightarrow J_K$$

defined by

$$x=(x_{\mathfrak p})_{\mathfrak p}
\longmapsto
\prod_{\mathfrak p}\mathfrak p^{v_{\mathfrak p}(x_{\mathfrak p})},$$

where $v_{\mathfrak p}$ is the normalized additive valuation at $\mathfrak p$. The product is finite because $x_{\mathfrak p}\in \mathcal O_{\mathfrak p}^{\times}$ for all but finitely many $\mathfrak p$. The kernel of this homomorphism is exactly $\widehat{\mathcal O}_K^\times$. Hence

$$I_{K,\mathrm{fin}}/\widehat{\mathcal O}_K^\times\cong J_K.$$

This identifies the group of fractional ideals with the quotient of the finite idele group obtained by forgetting the local unit components.

The diagonal embedding $K^\times\hookrightarrow I_{K,\mathrm{fin}}$ is compatible with principal ideals. If $a\in K^\times$, then the finite idele whose components are all equal to $a$ maps to the principal fractional ideal $(a)$. Therefore the preceding homomorphism descends to a quotient map from finite idele classes to ideal classes. In particular,

$$\operatorname{Cl}(K)
\cong
I_{K,\mathrm{fin}}/K^\times\widehat{\mathcal O}_K^\times.$$

Equivalently, using the full idele group,

$$\operatorname{Cl}(K)
\cong
\mathbb A_K^\times
\big/
K^\times
\left(
\widehat{\mathcal O}_K^\times
\times
\prod_{v\mid\infty}K_v^\times
\right).$$

Thus the ordinary ideal class group is obtained from the idele class group by quotienting out the finite local unit groups and the archimedean multiplicative factors.

The same construction gives a useful way to view why ideles contain more information than ideals. Passing from an idele $x=(x_v)_v$ to the associated fractional ideal records only the valuations $v_{\mathfrak p}(x_{\mathfrak p})$ at the finite places. It discards the unit components in $\mathcal O_{\mathfrak p}^{\times}$ and also discards the archimedean components. These extra local and topological data are precisely what make the idele class group suitable for class field theory and for the theory of Hecke characters.

A proof sketch is as follows. For each finite prime $\mathfrak p$, choose a uniformizer $\varpi_{\mathfrak p}$ of $K_{\mathfrak p}$. Every element of $K_{\mathfrak p}^{\times}$ can be written as $\varpi_{\mathfrak p}^n u$, with $n\in\mathbb Z$ and $u\in\mathcal O_{\mathfrak p}^{\times}$. Hence the valuation map records exactly the exponent of $\mathfrak p$. Since an idele is a unit at almost all finite places, only finitely many exponents are nonzero, so the formula above defines a fractional ideal. The kernel consists exactly of those finite ideles with all valuations zero, namely $\widehat{\mathcal O}_K^\times$. Surjectivity follows because any fractional ideal $\prod_{\mathfrak p}\mathfrak p^{n_{\mathfrak p}}$ is represented by the finite idele whose $\mathfrak p$-component is $\varpi_{\mathfrak p}^{n_{\mathfrak p}}$ for the finitely many primes appearing in the product and is $1$ elsewhere. Finally, quotienting by the diagonal image of $K^\times$ identifies principal fractional ideals with principal ideles, giving the ideal class group.

== Further structure and proof sketches ==
The following standard structural facts give equivalent descriptions of the idele topology, related subgroups, and some compactness and decomposition results used in the arithmetic theory of ideles.

=== Topology induced from the adele ring ===
The topology on $\mathbb A_K^\times$ can be described by a general construction for unit groups of topological rings. Let $R$ be a topological ring. Define

$$\begin{cases}
\iota: R^{\times} \to R \times R\\
x \mapsto (x,x^{-1}).
\end{cases}$$

Equipped with the topology induced from the product topology on $R \times R$ and $\iota$, $R^{\times}$ is a topological group and the inclusion map $R^{\times} \subset R$ is continuous. It is the coarsest topology, emerging from the topology on $R$, that makes $R^\times$ a topological group.

Proof.

Since $R$ is a topological ring, it is sufficient to show that the inverse map is continuous. Let $U\subset R^\times$ be open. Then $U \times U^{-1} \subset R \times R$ is open. It is necessary to show that $U^{-1} \subset R^\times$ is open, or equivalently that

$$U^{-1}\times (U^{-1})^{-1}=U^{-1}\times U\subset R\times R$$

is open. But this is the same condition applied to $U^{-1}$. The idele group is equipped with this topology.

The subset topology inherited from $\mathbb A_K$ is not a suitable candidate in general, since the group of units of a topological ring equipped with the subset topology may not be a topological group. For example, the inverse map in $\mathbb A_{\mathbb Q}$ is not continuous. The sequence

$$\begin{align}
x_1&=(2,1,\ldots)\\
x_2&=(1,3,1,\ldots)\\
x_3&=(1,1,5,1,\ldots)\\
&\vdots
\end{align}$$

converges to $1\in \mathbb A_{\mathbb Q}$. To see this, let $U$ be a neighbourhood of $0$; without loss of generality it can be assumed that

$$U=\prod_{p\leq N}U_p\times \prod_{p>N}\mathbb Z_p .$$

Since $(x_n)_p-1\in \mathbb Z_p$ for all $p$, it follows that $x_n-1\in U$ for $n$ large enough. However, the inverses of this sequence do not converge to $1$ in $\mathbb A_{\mathbb Q}$.

=== Subgroups attached to sets of places ===
For $S$ a subset of places of $K$, set

$$I_{K,S}:=\mathbb A_{K,S}^{\times},
\qquad
I_K^S:=(\mathbb A_K^S)^{\times}.$$

The following identities of topological groups hold:

$$\begin{align}
I_{K,S}&= {\prod_{v \in S}}^' K_v^{\times},\\
I_K^S&= {\prod_{v \notin S}}^' K_v^{\times},\\
I_K&= {\prod_v}^' K_v^{\times}.
\end{align}$$

Here the restricted product has the restricted product topology, generated by restricted open rectangles of the form

$$\prod_{v\in E}U_v\times \prod_{v\notin E}\mathcal O_v^\times,$$

where $E$ is a finite subset of the set of all places and $U_v\subset K_v^\times$ are open sets.

Proof.

It suffices to prove the identity for $I_K$; the other two follow similarly. First show the two sets are equal:

$$\begin{align}
I_K
&=\{x=(x_v)_v\in \mathbb A_K:\exists y=(y_v)_v\in\mathbb A_K:xy=1\}\\
&=\{x=(x_v)_v\in \mathbb A_K:\exists y=(y_v)_v\in\mathbb A_K:x_vy_v=1\quad \forall v\}\\
&=\{x=(x_v)_v:x_v\in K_v^\times\ \forall v
\text{ and }x_v\in\mathcal O_v^\times\text{ for almost all }v\}\\
&={\prod_v}'K_v^\times .
\end{align}$$

In going from the second line to the third, $x$ as well as $x^{-1}=y$ have to be in $\mathbb A_K$, meaning $x_v\in\mathcal O_v$ for almost all $v$ and $x_v^{-1}\in\mathcal O_v$ for almost all $v$. Therefore $x_v\in\mathcal O_v^\times$ for almost all $v$.

Now the topology on the left-hand side equals the topology on the right-hand side. Every open restricted rectangle is open in the topology of the idele group. Conversely, for a given $U\subset I_K$ open in the topology of the idele group, meaning that $U\times U^{-1}\subset \mathbb A_K\times\mathbb A_K$ is open, for each $u\in U$ there exists an open restricted rectangle contained in $U$ and containing $u$. Therefore $U$ is the union of all these restricted open rectangles and is open in the restricted product topology.

For each set of places $S$, $I_{K,S}$ is a locally compact topological group. The local compactness follows from the description of $I_{K,S}$ as a restricted product, and the topological group property follows from the preceding discussion on the group of units of a topological ring.

A neighbourhood system of $1\in I_K$ is given by all sets of the form

$$\prod_v U_v,$$

where $U_v$ is a neighbourhood of $1\in K_v^\times$ and $U_v=\mathcal O_v^\times$ for almost all $v$.

=== Finite extensions ===
Let $L/K$ be a finite extension. Then

$$I_L={\prod_w}' L_w^\times,$$

where the restricted product is with respect to the unit groups $\mathcal O_w^\times$.

There is a canonical embedding of $I_K$ in $I_L$. Map $a=(a_v)_v\in I_K$ to $a'=(a'_w)_w\in I_L$ with the property

$$a'_w=a_v\in K_v^\times\subset L_w^\times$$

for $w\mid v$. Therefore $I_K$ can be seen as a subgroup of $I_L$. An element $a=(a_w)_w\in I_L$ is in this subgroup if and only if its components satisfy the following properties: $a_w\in K_v^\times$ for $w\mid v$, and $a_w=a_{w'}$ for $w\mid v$ and $w'\mid v$ over the same place $v$ of $K$.

The embedding $I_K\to I_L$ induces an injective map

$$\begin{cases}
C_K\to C_L,\\
\alpha K^\times\mapsto \alpha L^\times .
\end{cases}$$

=== Principal ideles and discreteness ===
There is a natural embedding of $K^\times$ into $I_K$ given by the diagonal map

$$a\mapsto (a,a,a,\ldots).$$

Since $K^\times$ is a subset of $K_v^\times$ for all $v$, the embedding is well-defined and injective. In analogy to the ideal class group, the elements of $K^\times$ in $I_K$ are called principal ideles.

The subgroup $K^\times$ is closed and discrete in $I_K$. Therefore

$$C_K=I_K/K^\times$$

is a locally compact topological group and a Hausdorff space.

More generally, in the adelic algebra setting described below, $A^\times$ is a discrete subgroup of $\mathbb A_A^\times$.

=== Product formula and compactness of norm-one idele classes ===
For $\alpha=(\alpha_v)_v\in I_K$, define

$$|\alpha|:=\prod_v|\alpha_v|_v.$$

Since $\alpha$ is an idele, this product is finite and therefore well-defined. The set of norm-one ideles is

$$I_K^1:=\{x\in I_K:|x|=1\}=\ker(|\cdot|).$$

The subgroup $I_K^1$ is a closed subgroup of $I_K$. The $\mathbb A_K$-topology on $I_K^1$ equals the subspace topology of $I_K$ on $I_K^1$.

The product formula states that

$$|k|=1$$

for all $k\in K^\times$.

Proof.

For number fields, the case of global function fields being similar, let $K$ be a number field and $a\in K^\times$. It has to be shown that

$$\prod_v |a|_v=1.$$

For a finite place $v$ for which the corresponding prime ideal $\mathfrak p_v$ does not divide $(a)$, $v(a)=0$ and therefore $|a|_v=1$. This is valid for almost all $\mathfrak p_v$. There is

$$\begin{align}
\prod_v |a|_v
&=\prod_{p\leq \infty}\prod_{v\mid p}|a|_v\\
&=\prod_{p\leq \infty}\prod_{v\mid p}|N_{K_v/\mathbb Q_p}(a)|_p\\
&=\prod_{p\leq \infty}|N_{K/\mathbb Q}(a)|_p .
\end{align}$$

In going from the first line to the second, the identity

$$|a|_w=|N_{L_w/K_v}(a)|_v$$

is used, where $v$ is a place of $K$ and $w$ is a place of $L$ lying above $v$. Going from the second line to the third uses the compatibility of local and global norms. The norm is in $\mathbb Q$, so it remains to prove the product formula over $\mathbb Q$. Write

$$a=\pm \prod_{p<\infty}p^{v_p},$$

where $v_p\in\mathbb Z$ is $0$ for almost all $p$. Then

$$\begin{align}
|a|
&=\left(\prod_{p<\infty}|a|_p\right)\cdot |a|_\infty\\
&=\left(\prod_{p<\infty}p^{-v_p}\right)\cdot
\left(\prod_{p<\infty}p^{v_p}\right)\\
&=1.
\end{align}$$

The following approximation lemma is used in the proof of compactness.

Lemma. There exists a constant $C$, depending only on $K$, such that for every $\alpha=(\alpha_v)_v\in \mathbb A_K$ satisfying

$$\prod_v|\alpha_v|_v>C,$$

there exists $\beta\in K^\times$ such that

$$|\beta|_v\leq |\alpha_v|_v$$

for all $v$.

Corollary. Let $v_0$ be a place of $K$ and let $\delta_v>0$ be given for all $v\neq v_0$, with the property that $\delta_v=1$ for almost all $v$. Then there exists $\beta\in K^\times$ such that

$$|\beta|_v\leq \delta_v$$

for all $v\neq v_0$.

Proof.

Let $C$ be the constant from the lemma. Let $\pi_v$ be a uniformizing element of $\mathcal O_v$. Define the adele $\alpha=(\alpha_v)_v$ by $\alpha_v:=\pi_v^{k_v}$, with $k_v\in\mathbb Z$ minimal so that

$$|\alpha_v|_v\leq \delta_v$$

for all $v\neq v_0$. Then $k_v=0$ for almost all $v$. Define $\alpha_{v_0}:=\pi_{v_0}^{k_{v_0}}$, with $k_{v_0}\in\mathbb Z$, so that

$$\prod_v|\alpha_v|_v>C.$$

This works because $k_v=0$ for almost all $v$. By the lemma there exists $\beta\in K^\times$ such that

$$|\beta|_v\leq |\alpha_v|_v\leq \delta_v$$

for all $v\neq v_0$.

Theorem. $K^\times$ is discrete and cocompact in $I_K^1$.

Proof.

Since $K^\times$ is discrete in $I_K$, it is also discrete in $I_K^1$. To prove the compactness of $I_K^1/K^\times$, let $C$ be the constant of the lemma and suppose $\alpha\in\mathbb A_K$ satisfies

$$\prod_v|\alpha_v|_v>C.$$

Define

$$W_\alpha:=
\left\{
\xi=(\xi_v)_v\in \mathbb A_K:
|\xi_v|_v\leq |\alpha_v|_v\text{ for all }v
\right\}.$$

Clearly $W_\alpha$ is compact. It can be claimed that the natural projection

$$W_\alpha\cap I_K^1\to I_K^1/K^\times$$

is surjective. Let $\beta=(\beta_v)_v\in I_K^1$ be arbitrary. Then

$$|\beta|=\prod_v|\beta_v|_v=1,$$

and therefore

$$\prod_v|\beta_v^{-1}|_v=1.$$

It follows that

$$\prod_v|\beta_v^{-1}\alpha_v|_v
=
\prod_v|\alpha_v|_v
>C.$$

By the lemma there exists $\eta\in K^\times$ such that

$$|\eta|_v\leq |\beta_v^{-1}\alpha_v|_v$$

for all $v$, and therefore $\eta\beta\in W_\alpha$. This proves the surjectivity of the natural projection. Since it is also continuous, compactness follows.

=== The rational numbers ===
There is a canonical isomorphism

$$I_{\mathbb Q}^1/\mathbb Q^\times\cong \widehat{\mathbb Z}^{\times}.$$

Furthermore, $\widehat{\mathbb Z}^{\times}\times\{1\}\subset I_{\mathbb Q}^1$ is a set of representatives for $I_{\mathbb Q}^1/\mathbb Q^\times$, and $\widehat{\mathbb Z}^{\times}\times(0,\infty)\subset I_{\mathbb Q}$ is a set of representatives for $I_{\mathbb Q}/\mathbb Q^\times$.

Proof.

Consider the map

$$\begin{cases}
\phi:\widehat{\mathbb Z}^{\times}\to I_{\mathbb Q}^1/\mathbb Q^\times,\\
(a_p)_p\mapsto ((a_p)_p,1)\mathbb Q^\times .
\end{cases}$$

This map is well-defined, since $|a_p|_p=1$ for all $p$ and therefore

$$\left(\prod_{p<\infty}|a_p|_p\right)\cdot 1=1.$$

Obviously $\phi$ is a continuous group homomorphism. Suppose

$$((a_p)_p,1)\mathbb Q^\times=((b_p)_p,1)\mathbb Q^\times .$$

Then there exists $q\in\mathbb Q^\times$ such that

$$((a_p)_p,1)q=((b_p)_p,1).$$

By considering the infinite place it can be seen that $q=1$, which proves injectivity. To show surjectivity, let

$$((\beta_p)_p,\beta_\infty)\mathbb Q^\times\in I_{\mathbb Q}^1/\mathbb Q^\times.$$

The absolute value of this element is $1$, and therefore

$$|\beta_\infty|_\infty=\frac{1}{\prod_p|\beta_p|_p}\in\mathbb Q.$$

Hence $\beta_\infty\in\mathbb Q$, and there is

$$((\beta_p)_p,\beta_\infty)\mathbb Q^\times
=
\left(
\left(\frac{\beta_p}{\beta_\infty}\right)_p,1
\right)\mathbb Q^\times.$$

Since

$$\forall p:\qquad
\left|\frac{\beta_p}{\beta_\infty}\right|_p=1,$$

it follows that $\phi$ is surjective.

The absolute value function induces the following isomorphisms of topological groups:

$$\begin{align}
I_{\mathbb Q}&\cong I_{\mathbb Q}^1\times(0,\infty),\\
I_{\mathbb Q}^1&\cong I_{\mathbb Q,\mathrm{fin}}\times\{\pm1\}.
\end{align}$$

The isomorphisms are given by

$$\begin{cases}
\psi:I_{\mathbb Q}\to I_{\mathbb Q}^1\times(0,\infty),\\
a=(a_{\mathrm{fin}},a_\infty)\mapsto
\left(a_{\mathrm{fin}},\frac{a_\infty}{|a|},|a|\right),
\end{cases}$$

and

$$\begin{cases}
\widetilde\psi:I_{\mathbb Q,\mathrm{fin}}\times\{\pm1\}\to I_{\mathbb Q}^1,\\
(a_{\mathrm{fin}},\varepsilon)\mapsto
\left(a_{\mathrm{fin}},\frac{\varepsilon}{|a_{\mathrm{fin}}|}\right).
\end{cases}$$

=== Decomposition of the idele group and idele class group ===
The idele norm gives the following decompositions:

$$\begin{align}
I_K &\cong I_K^1\times M,
\quad
\begin{cases}
M\subset I_K\text{ discrete and }M\cong\mathbb Z,
&\operatorname{char}(K)>0,\\
M\subset I_K\text{ closed and }M\cong\mathbb R_{>0},
&\operatorname{char}(K)=0,
\end{cases}\\
C_K &\cong I_K^1/K^\times\times N,
\quad
\begin{cases}
N=\mathbb Z,
&\operatorname{char}(K)>0,\\
N=\mathbb R_{>0},
&\operatorname{char}(K)=0.
\end{cases}
\end{align}$$

Proof.

First suppose $\operatorname{char}(K)=p>0$. For each place $v$ of $K$, $\operatorname{char}(K_v)=p$, so that for all $x\in K_v^\times$, $|x|_v$ belongs to the subgroup of $\mathbb R_{>0}$ generated by $p$. Therefore, for each $z\in I_K$, $|z|$ is in the subgroup of $\mathbb R_{>0}$ generated by $p$. Thus the image of the homomorphism $z\mapsto |z|$ is a discrete subgroup of $\mathbb R_{>0}$. Since this group is nontrivial, it is generated by $Q=p^m$ for some $m\in\mathbb N$. Choose $z_1\in I_K$ such that $|z_1|=Q$. Then $I_K$ is the direct product of $I_K^1$ and the subgroup generated by $z_1$. This subgroup is discrete and isomorphic to $\mathbb Z$.

Now suppose $\operatorname{char}(K)=0$. For $\lambda\in\mathbb R_{>0}$, define

$$z(\lambda)=(z_v)_v,
\qquad
z_v=
\begin{cases}
1,&v\nmid\infty,\\
\lambda,&v\mid\infty.
\end{cases}$$

The map $\lambda\mapsto z(\lambda)$ is an isomorphism of $\mathbb R_{>0}$ onto a closed subgroup $M$ of $I_K$, and $I_K\cong M\times I_K^1$. The isomorphism is given by multiplication:

$$\begin{cases}
\phi:M\times I_K^1\to I_K,\\
((\alpha_v)_v,(\beta_v)_v)\mapsto(\alpha_v\beta_v)_v.
\end{cases}$$

Obviously, $\phi$ is a homomorphism. To show it is injective, let $(\alpha_v\beta_v)_v=1$. Since $\alpha_v=1$ for $v\nmid\infty$, it follows that $\beta_v=1$ for $v\nmid\infty$. Moreover, there exists a $\lambda\in\mathbb R_{>0}$ such that $\alpha_v=\lambda$ for $v\mid\infty$. Therefore $\beta_v=\lambda^{-1}$ for $v\mid\infty$. Since

$$\prod_v|\beta_v|_v=1,$$

it follows that $\lambda^n=1$, where $n$ is the number of archimedean places of $K$. Consequently $\lambda=1$, and therefore $\phi$ is injective.

To show surjectivity, let $\gamma=(\gamma_v)_v\in I_K$. Define $\lambda:=|\gamma|^{1/n}$, and define $\alpha_v=1$ for $v\nmid\infty$ and $\alpha_v=\lambda$ for $v\mid\infty$. Let

$$\beta=\frac{\gamma}{\alpha}.$$

Then

$$|\beta|=\frac{|\gamma|}{|\alpha|}=\frac{\lambda^n}{\lambda^n}=1.$$

Therefore $\phi$ is surjective. The statements for $C_K$ follow similarly.

=== Characterisation by a finite set of places ===
Let $K$ be a number field. There exists a finite set of places $S$ such that

$$I_K=
\left(
I_{K,S}\times \prod_{v\notin S}\mathcal O_v^\times
\right)K^\times
=
\left(
\prod_{v\in S}K_v^\times
\times
\prod_{v\notin S}\mathcal O_v^\times
\right)K^\times .$$

Proof.

The class number of a number field is finite, so let $\mathfrak a_1,\ldots,\mathfrak a_h$ be ideals representing the classes in $\operatorname{Cl}_K$. These ideals are generated by a finite number of prime ideals $\mathfrak p_1,\ldots,\mathfrak p_n$. Let $S$ be a finite set of places containing the archimedean places and the finite places corresponding to $\mathfrak p_1,\ldots,\mathfrak p_n$. Consider the isomorphism

$$I_K/
\left(
\prod_{v<\infty}\mathcal O_v^\times
\times
\prod_{v\mid\infty}K_v^\times
\right)
\cong J_K,$$

induced by

$$(\alpha_v)_v\mapsto
\prod_{v<\infty}\mathfrak p_v^{v(\alpha_v)}.$$

At infinite places the statement is immediate, so it remains to prove the statement for finite places. The inclusion $\supset$ is obvious. Let $\alpha\in I_{K,\mathrm{fin}}$. The corresponding ideal

$$(\alpha)=\prod_{v<\infty}\mathfrak p_v^{v(\alpha_v)}$$

belongs to a class $\mathfrak a_iK^\times$, meaning

$$(\alpha)=\mathfrak a_i(a)$$

for a principal ideal $(a)$. The idele $\alpha'=\alpha a^{-1}$ maps to the ideal $\mathfrak a_i$ under the map $I_{K,\mathrm{fin}}\to J_K$. That means

$$\mathfrak a_i=
\prod_{v<\infty}\mathfrak p_v^{v(\alpha'_v)}.$$

Since the prime ideals in $\mathfrak a_i$ are in $S$, it follows that $v(\alpha'_v)=0$ for all $v\notin S$. Thus $\alpha'_v\in \mathcal O_v^\times$ for all $v\notin S$. It follows that $\alpha'=\alpha a^{-1}\in I_{K,S}$, and therefore $\alpha\in I_{K,S}K^\times$.

=== Ideles of finite-dimensional algebras ===
The construction also extends to finite-dimensional algebras over $K$. Let $A$ be a finite-dimensional algebra over $K$. Since $\mathbb A_A^\times$ is not a topological group with the subspace topology in general, equip $\mathbb A_A^\times$ with the topology similar to $I_K$ above and call $\mathbb A_A^\times$ the idele group of $A$. The elements of the idele group are called ideles of $A$.

Let $\alpha$ be a finite subset of $A$ containing a basis of $A$ over $K$. For each finite place $v$ of $K$, let $\alpha_v$ be the $\mathcal O_v$-module generated by $\alpha$ in $A_v$. There exists a finite set of places $P_0$ containing the archimedean places such that for all $v\notin P_0$, $\alpha_v$ is a compact subring of $A_v$. For each $v$, $A_v^\times$ is an open subset of $A_v$ and the map $x\mapsto x^{-1}$ is continuous on $A_v^\times$. As a consequence, $x\mapsto (x,x^{-1})$ maps $A_v^\times$ homeomorphically onto its image in $A_v\times A_v$. For each $v\notin P_0$, the group $\alpha_v^\times$ is an open and compact subgroup of $A_v^\times$.

Let $P\supset P_\infty$ be a finite set of places. Then

$$\mathbb A_A(P,\alpha)^\times
:=
\prod_{v\in P}A_v^\times
\times
\prod_{v\notin P}\alpha_v^\times$$

is an open subgroup of $\mathbb A_A^\times$, and $\mathbb A_A^\times$ is the union of all $\mathbb A_A(P,\alpha)^\times$. In the special case $A=K$, for each finite set of places $P\supset P_\infty$,

$$\mathbb A_K(P)^\times
=
\prod_{v\in P}K_v^\times
\times
\prod_{v\notin P}\mathcal O_v^\times$$

is an open subgroup of $\mathbb A_K^\times=I_K$. Furthermore, $I_K$ is the union of all $\mathbb A_K(P)^\times$.
