= Artin reciprocity =

Mathematical theorem

The Artin reciprocity law, which was established by Emil Artin in a series of papers (1924; 1927; 1930), is a general theorem in number theory that forms a central part of global class field theory. The term "reciprocity law" refers to a long line of more concrete number theoretic statements which it generalized, from the quadratic reciprocity law and the reciprocity laws of Eisenstein and Kummer to Hilbert's product formula for the norm symbol. Artin's result provided a partial solution to Hilbert's ninth problem.

== Statement ==
Let $L/K$ be a Galois extension of global fields, $\text{Gal}(L/K)$ be Galois group of this extension and $C_K, C_L$ denote the idèle class groups of respectively $K$ and $L$. Let:

$$N_{L/K}: C_L \rightarrow C_K$$

denote idele norm map. The Artin reciprocity law states that there exists a canonical isomorphism between quotient group and abelianization of Galois group:

$$\theta: C_K/{N_{L/K}(C_L)} \to \operatorname{Gal}(L/K)^{\text{ab}},$$

that is defined by assembling the local maps:

$$\theta_v: K_v^{\times}/N_{L_v/K_v}(L_v^{\times}) \to \text{Gal}(L/K)^{\text{ab}},$$

for different places $v$ of $K$.

=== Remarks ===
- The map $\theta$ is called global symbol map or Artin symbol.
- For each place $v$ the local map $\theta_v$ is called local Artin symbol, local reciprocity map or norm residue symbol.
- The local maps $\theta_v$ are isomorphisms themselves, this is the content of local reciprocity law, key result in local class field theory.

=== Proof ===
A cohomological proof of the global reciprocity law can be achieved by first establishing that

$$(\operatorname{Gal}(K^{\text{sep}}/K),\varinjlim C_L)$$

constitutes a class formation in the sense of Artin and Tate. Then one proves that

$$\hat{H}^{0}(\operatorname{Gal}(L/K), C_L) \simeq\hat{H}^{-2}(\operatorname{Gal}(L/K), \Z),$$

where $\hat{H}^{i}$ denote the Tate cohomology groups. Working out the cohomology groups establishes that $\theta$ is an isomorphism.

== Significance ==
Artin's reciprocity law implies a description of the abelianization of the absolute Galois group of a global field K which is based on the Hasse local–global principle and the use of the Frobenius elements. Together with the Takagi existence theorem, it is used to describe the abelian extensions of K in terms of the arithmetic of K and to understand the behavior of the nonarchimedean places in them. Therefore, the Artin reciprocity law can be interpreted as one of the main theorems of global class field theory. It can be used to prove that Artin L-functions are meromorphic, and also to prove the Chebotarev density theorem.

Two years after the publication of his general reciprocity law in 1927, Artin rediscovered the transfer homomorphism of I. Schur and used the reciprocity law to translate the principalization problem for ideal classes of algebraic number fields into the group theoretic task of determining the kernels of transfers of finite non-abelian groups.

== Finite extensions of global fields ==
(See math.stackexchange.com for an explanation of some of the terms used here)

The definition of the Artin map for a finite abelian extension L/K of global fields (such as a finite abelian extension of $\Q$) has a concrete description in terms of prime ideals and Frobenius elements.

If $\mathfrak{p}$ is a prime of K then the decomposition groups of primes $\mathfrak{P}$ above $\mathfrak{p}$ are equal in Gal(L/K) since the latter group is abelian. If $\mathfrak{p}$ is unramified in L, then the decomposition group $D_\mathfrak{p}$ is canonically isomorphic to the Galois group of the extension of residue fields $\mathcal{O}_{L,\mathfrak{P}}/\mathfrak{P}$ over $\mathcal{O}_{K,\mathfrak{p}}/\mathfrak{p}$. There is therefore a canonically defined Frobenius element in Gal(L/K) denoted by $\mathrm{Frob}_\mathfrak{p}$ or $\left(\frac{L/K}{\mathfrak{p}}\right)$. If Δ denotes the relative discriminant of L/K, the Artin symbol (or Artin map, or (global) reciprocity map) of L/K is defined on the group of prime-to-Δ fractional ideals, $I_K^\Delta$, by linearity:

$$\begin{cases}
\left(\frac{L/K}{\cdot}\right):I_K^\Delta \longrightarrow \operatorname{Gal}(L/K)\\
\prod_{i=1}^m\mathfrak{p}_i^{n_i} \longmapsto \prod_{i=1}^m\left(\frac{L/K}{\mathfrak{p}_i}\right)^{n_i}
\end{cases}$$

The Artin reciprocity law (or global reciprocity law) states that there is a modulus c of K such that the Artin map induces an isomorphism

$$I_K^\mathbf{c}/i(K_{\mathbf{c},1})\mathrm{N}_{L/K}(I_L^\mathbf{c})\overset{\sim}{\longrightarrow}\mathrm{Gal}(L/K)$$

where K_{c,1} is the ray modulo c, N_{L/K} is the norm map associated to L/K and $I_L^\mathbf{c}$ is the fractional ideals of L prime to c. Such a modulus c is called a defining modulus for L/K. The smallest defining modulus is called the conductor of L/K and typically denoted $\mathfrak{f}(L/K).$

=== Examples ===
==== Quadratic fields ====
If $d\neq1$ is a squarefree integer, $K=\Q,$ and $L=\Q(\sqrt{d})$, then $\operatorname{Gal}(L/\Q)$ can be identified with {±1}. The discriminant Δ of L over $\Q$ is d or 4d depending on whether d ≡ 1 (mod 4) or not. The Artin map is then defined on primes p that do not divide Δ by

$$p\mapsto\left(\frac{\Delta}{p}\right)$$

where $\left(\frac{\Delta}{p}\right)$ is the Kronecker symbol. More specifically, the conductor of $L/\Q$ is the principal ideal (Δ) or (Δ)∞ according to whether Δ is positive or negative, and the Artin map on a prime-to-Δ ideal (n) is given by the Kronecker symbol $\left(\frac{\Delta}{n}\right).$ This shows that a prime p is split or inert in L according to whether $\left(\frac{\Delta}{p}\right)$ is 1 or −1.

==== Cyclotomic fields ====
Let m > 1 be either an odd integer or a multiple of 4, let $\zeta_m$ be a primitive mth root of unity, and let $L = \Q(\zeta_m)$ be the mth cyclotomic field. $\operatorname{Gal}(L/\Q)$ can be identified with $(\Z/m\Z)^{\times}$ by sending σ to a_{σ} given by the rule

$$\sigma(\zeta_m)=\zeta_m^{a_\sigma}.$$

The conductor of $L/\Q$ is (m)∞, and the Artin map on a prime-to-m ideal (n) is simply n (mod m) in $(\Z/m\Z)^{\times}.$

=== Relation to quadratic reciprocity ===
Let p and $\ell$ be distinct odd primes. For convenience, let $\ell^* = (-1)^{\frac{\ell-1}{2}}\ell$ (which is always 1 (mod 4)). Then, quadratic reciprocity states that

$$\left(\frac{\ell^*}{p}\right)=\left(\frac{p}{\ell}\right).$$

The relation between the quadratic and Artin reciprocity laws is given by studying the quadratic field $F=\Q(\sqrt{\ell^*})$ and the cyclotomic field $L=\Q(\zeta_\ell)$ as follows. First, F is a subfield of L, so if H = Gal(L/F) and $G= \operatorname{Gal}(L/\Q),$ then $\operatorname{Gal}(F/\Q) = G/H.$ Since the latter has order 2, the subgroup H must be the group of squares in $(\Z/\ell\Z)^{\times}.$ A basic property of the Artin symbol says that for every prime-to-ℓ ideal (n)

$$\left(\frac{F/\Q}{(n)}\right)=\left(\frac{L/\Q}{(n)}\right)\pmod H.$$

When n = p, this shows that $\left(\frac{\ell^*}{p}\right)=1$ if and only if, p modulo ℓ is in H, i.e. if and only if, p is a square modulo ℓ.

== Statement in terms of L-functions ==
An alternative version of the reciprocity law, leading to the Langlands program, connects Artin L-functions associated to abelian extensions of a number field with Hecke L-functions associated to characters of the idèle class group.

A Hecke character (or Größencharakter) of a number field K is defined to be a quasicharacter of the idèle class group of K. Robert Langlands interpreted Hecke characters as automorphic forms on the reductive algebraic group GL(1) over the ring of adeles of K.

Let $E/K$ be an abelian Galois extension with Galois group G. Then for any character $\sigma: G \to \Complex^{\times}$ (i.e. one-dimensional complex representation of the group G), there exists a Hecke character $\chi$ of K such that

$$L_{E/K}^{\mathrm{Artin}}(\sigma, s) = L_{K}^{\mathrm{Hecke}}(\chi, s)$$

where the left hand side is the Artin L-function associated to the extension with character σ and the right hand side is the Hecke L-function associated with χ, Section 7.D of.

The formulation of the Artin reciprocity law as an equality of L-functions allows formulation of a generalisation to n-dimensional representations, though a direct correspondence is still lacking.

== See also ==
- List of eponymous laws
