= Conductor (class field theory) =

In algebraic number theory, the conductor of a finite abelian extension of local or global fields provides a quantitative measure of the ramification in the extension. The definition of the conductor is related to the Artin map.

== Local conductor ==
Let $L/K$ be a finite abelian extension of non-Archimedean local fields. The conductor of $L/K$, denoted $\mathfrak{f}(L/K)$, is the smallest non-negative integer $n$ such that the higher unit group

$$U^{(n)} = 1 + \mathfrak{m}_K^n = \left\{u\in\mathcal{O}^\times: u \equiv 1\, \left(\operatorname{mod} \mathfrak{m}_K^n\right)\right\}$$

is contained in $N_{L/K}(L^\times)$, where $N_{L/K}$ is field norm map and $\mathfrak{m}_K$ is the maximal ideal of $K$. Equivalently, $n$ is the smallest integer such that the local Artin map is trivial on $U_K^{(n)}$. Sometimes, the conductor is defined as $\mathfrak{m}_K^n$ where $n$ is as above.

The conductor of an extension measures the ramification. Qualitatively, the extension is unramified if and only if the conductor is zero, and it is tamely ramified if and only if the conductor is 1. More precisely, the conductor computes the non-triviality of higher ramification groups: if $s$ is the largest integer for which the "lower numbering" higher ramification group G_{s} is non-trivial, then $\mathfrak{f}(L/K) = \eta_{L/K}(s) + 1$, where $\eta_{L/K}$ is the function that translates from "lower numbering" to "upper numbering" of higher ramification groups.

The conductor of $L/K$ is also related to the Artin conductors of characters of the Galois group $\operatorname{Gal}(L/K)$. Specifically,

$$\mathfrak{m}_K^{\mathfrak{f}(L/K)} = \operatorname{lcm}\limits_\chi \mathfrak{m}_K^{\mathfrak{f}_\chi}$$

where $\chi$ varies over all multiplicative complex characters of $\operatorname{Gal}(L/K)$, $\mathfrak{f}_\chi$ is the Artin conductor of $\chi$, and lcm is the least common multiple.

=== More general fields ===
The conductor can be defined in the same way for $L/K$ a not necessarily abelian finite Galois extension of local fields. However, it only depends on $L^\mathrm{ab}/K$, the maximal abelian extension of $K$ in $L$, because of the "norm limitation theorem", which states that, in this situation,

$$N_{L/K}\left(L^\times\right) = N_{L^{\text{ab}}/K} \Big(\left(L^{\text{ab}}\right)^\times \Big).$$

Additionally, the conductor can be defined when $L$ and $K$ are allowed to be slightly more general than local, namely if they are complete valued fields with quasi-finite residue field.

=== Archimedean fields ===
Mostly for the sake of global conductors, the conductor of the trivial extension $\R/\R$ is defined to be 0, and the conductor of the extension $\C/\R$ is defined to be 1.

== Global conductor ==
=== Algebraic number fields ===
The conductor of an abelian extension $L/K$ of number fields can be defined, similarly to the local case, using the Artin map. Specifically, let $\theta: l^m\to\operatorname{Gal}(L/K)$ be the global Artin map where the modulus m is a defining modulus for L/K; we say that Artin reciprocity holds for m if θ factors through the ray class group modulo m. We define the conductor of $L/K$, denoted $\mathfrak{f}(L/K)$, to be the highest common factor of all moduli for which reciprocity holds; in fact reciprocity holds for $\mathfrak{f}(L/K)$, so it is the smallest such modulus.

==== Example ====
- Taking as base the field of rational numbers, the Kronecker–Weber theorem states that an algebraic number field $K$ is abelian over $\Q$ if and only if it is a subfield of a cyclotomic field $\Q(\zeta_n)$, where $\zeta_n$ denotes a primitive $n$th root of unity. If $n$ is the smallest integer for which this holds, the conductor of $K$ is then $n$ if $K$ is fixed by complex conjugation and $n \infty$ otherwise.
- Let $L/K$ be $\Q(\sqrt{d})/\Q$ where $d$ is a squarefree integer. Then,
  $$\mathfrak{f}(\Q(\sqrt{d})/\Q) = \begin{cases}
|\Delta_{\Q(\sqrt{d})}| & \text{for }d > 0 \\
\infty|\Delta_{\Q(\sqrt{d})}| & \text{for }d < 0
\end{cases}$$

where $\Delta_{\Q(\sqrt{d})}$ is the discriminant of $\Q(\sqrt{d})/\Q$.

==== Relation to local conductors and ramification ====
The global conductor is the product of local conductors:

$$\mathfrak{f}(L/K) = \prod_\mathfrak{p}\mathfrak{p}^{\mathfrak{f}\left(L_\mathfrak{p}/K_\mathfrak{p}\right)}.$$

As a consequence, a finite prime is ramified in $L/K$ if, and only if, it divides $\mathfrak{f}(L/K)$. An infinite prime $v$ occurs in the conductor if, and only if, $v$ is real and becomes complex in $L$.
