= Hecke character =

Type of character in number theory

In number theory, a Hecke character is a generalisation of a Dirichlet character, introduced by Erich Hecke to construct a class of L-functions larger than Dirichlet L-functions, and a natural setting for the Dedekind zeta-functions and certain others which have functional equations analogous to that of the Riemann zeta-function.

== Definition ==
A Hecke character is a character of the idele class group of a number field or global function field. It corresponds uniquely to a character of the idele group which is trivial on principal ideles, via composition with the projection map.

This definition depends on the definition of a character, which varies slightly between authors: It may be defined as a homomorphism to the non-zero complex numbers (also called a "quasicharacter"), or as a homomorphism to the unit circle in $\mathbb{C}$ ("unitary"). Any quasicharacter (of the idele class group) can be written uniquely as a unitary character times a real power of the norm, so there is no big difference between the two definitions.

The conductor of a Hecke character $\chi$ is the largest ideal $\mathfrak{m}$ such that $\chi$ is a Hecke character mod $\mathfrak{m}$. Here we say that $\chi$ is a Hecke character mod $\mathfrak{m}$ if $\chi$ (considered as a character on the idele group) is trivial on the group of finite ideles whose every $\nu$-adic component lies in $1 + \mathfrak{m}O_\nu$.

== Größencharakter ==
A Größencharakter (often written Grössencharakter, Grossencharacter, etc.), origin of a Hecke character, going back to Hecke, is defined in terms of a character on the group of fractional ideals. For a number field $K$, let $\mathfrak{m} = \mathfrak{m}_f \mathfrak{m}_\infty$ be a $K$-modulus, with $\mathfrak{m}_f$, the "finite part", being an integral ideal of $K$ and $\mathfrak{m}_\infty$, the "infinite part", being a (formal) product of real places of $K$. Let $I_\mathfrak{m}$ denote the group of fractional ideals of $K$ relatively prime to $\mathfrak{m}_f$ and let $P_\mathfrak{m}$ denote the subgroup of principal fractional ideals $(a)$ where $a$ is near $1$ at each place of $\mathfrak{m}$ in accordance with the multiplicities of its factors. That is, for each finite place $\nu$ in $\mathfrak{m}_f$, the order $ord_\nu(a-1)$ is at least as large as the exponent for $\nu$ in $\mathfrak{m}_f$, and $a$ is positive under each real embedding in $\mathfrak{m}_\infty$. A Größencharakter with modulus $\mathfrak{m}$ is a group homomorphism from $I_\mathfrak{m}$ into the nonzero complex numbers such that on ideals $(a)$ in $P_\mathfrak{m}$ its value is equal to the value at $a$ of a continuous homomorphism to the nonzero complex numbers from the product of the multiplicative groups of all Archimedean completions of $K$ where each local component of the homomorphism has the same real part (in the exponent). (Here we embed $a$ into the product of Archimedean completions of $K$ using embeddings corresponding to the various Archimedean places on $K$.) Thus a Größencharakter may be defined on the ray class group modulo $\mathfrak{m}$, which is the quotient $I_\mathfrak{m} / P_\mathfrak{m}$.

Strictly speaking, Hecke made the stipulation about behavior on principal ideals for those admitting a totally positive generator. So, in terms of the definition given above, he really only worked with moduli where all real places appeared. The role of the infinite part m_{∞} is now subsumed under the notion of an infinity-type.

== Relationship between Größencharakter and Hecke character ==
A Hecke character and a Größencharakter are essentially the same notion with a one-to-one correspondence. The ideal definition is much more complicated than the idelic one, and Hecke's motivation for his definition was to construct L-functions (sometimes referred to as Hecke L-functions) that extend the notion of a Dirichlet L-function from the rationals to other number fields. For a Größencharakter χ, its L-function is defined to be the Dirichlet series

$$\sum_{(I,m)=1} \chi(I) N(I)^{-s} = L(s, \chi)$$

carried out over integral ideals relatively prime to the modulus $\mathfrak{m}$ of the Größencharakter. Here $N(I)$ denotes the ideal norm. The common real part condition governing the behavior of Größencharakter on the subgroups $P_\mathfrak{m}$ implies these Dirichlet series are absolutely convergent in some right half-plane. Hecke proved these L-functions have a meromorphic continuation to the whole complex plane, being analytic except for a simple pole of order 1 at '$s=1$ when the character is trivial. For primitive Größencharakter (defined relative to a modulus in a similar manner to primitive Dirichlet characters), Hecke showed these L-functions satisfy a functional equation relating the values of the L-function of a character and the L-function of its complex conjugate character.

Consider a character $\psi$ of the idele class group, taken to be a map into the unit circle which is 1 on principal ideles and on an exceptional finite set $S$ containing all infinite places. Then $\psi$ generates a character $\chi$ of the ideal group $I^S$, which is the free abelian group on the prime ideals not in $S$. Take a uniformising element $\pi$ for each prime $\mathfrak{p}$ not in $S$ and define a map $\Pi$ from $I^S$ to idele classes by mapping each $\mathfrak{p}$ to the class of the idele which is $\pi$ in the $\mathfrak{p}$ coordinate and $1$ everywhere else. Let $\chi$ be the composite of $\Pi$ and $\psi$. Then $\chi$ is well-defined as a character on the ideal group.

In the opposite direction, given an admissible character $\chi$ of $I^S$ there corresponds a unique idele class character $\psi$. Here admissible refers to the existence of a modulus $\mathfrak{m}$ based on the set $S$ such that the character $\chi$ evaluates to $1$ on the ideals which are 1 mod $\mathfrak{m}$.

The characters are 'big' in the sense that the infinity-type when present non-trivially means these characters are not of finite order. The finite-order Hecke characters are all, in a sense, accounted for by class field theory: their L-functions are Artin L-functions, as Artin reciprocity shows. But even a field as simple as the Gaussian field has Hecke characters that go beyond finite order in a serious way (see the example below). Later developments in complex multiplication theory indicated that the proper place of the 'big' characters was to provide the Hasse–Weil L-functions for an important class of algebraic varieties (or even motives).

== Special cases ==
- A Dirichlet character is a Hecke character of finite order. It is determined by values on the set of totally positive principal ideals which are 1 with respect to some modulus m.
- A Hilbert character is a Dirichlet character of conductor 1. The number of Hilbert characters is the order of the class group of the field. Class field theory identifies the Hilbert characters with the characters of the Galois group of the Hilbert class field.

== Examples ==
- For the field of rational numbers, the idele class group is isomorphic to the product of positive reals $\mathbb{R}^{+}$ with all the unit groups of the p-adic integers. So a quasicharacter can be written as product of a power of the norm with a Dirichlet character.
- A Hecke character χ of the Gaussian integers of conductor 1 is of the form

χ((a)) = |a|^{s}(a/|a|)^{4n}

for s imaginary and n an integer, where a is a generator of the ideal (a). The only units are powers of i, so the factor of 4 in the exponent ensures that the character is well defined on ideals.

== Tate's thesis ==
Hecke's original proof of the functional equation for L(s,χ) used an explicit theta-function. John Tate's 1950 Princeton doctoral dissertation, written under the supervision of Emil Artin, applied Pontryagin duality systematically, to remove the need for any special functions. A similar theory was independently developed by Kenkichi Iwasawa which was the subject of his 1950 ICM talk. A later reformulation in a Bourbaki seminar by Weil 1966 showed that parts of Tate's proof could be expressed by distribution theory: the space of distributions (for Schwartz–Bruhat test functions) on the adele group of K transforming under the action of the ideles by a given χ has dimension 1.

== Algebraic Hecke characters ==
An algebraic Hecke character is a Hecke character taking algebraic values: they were introduced by Weil in 1947 under the name type A_{0}. Such characters occur in class field theory and the theory of complex multiplication.

Indeed let E be an elliptic curve defined over a number field F with complex multiplication by the imaginary quadratic field K, and suppose that K is contained in F. Then there is an algebraic Hecke character χ for F, with exceptional set S the set of primes of bad reduction of E together with the infinite places. This character has the property that for a prime ideal p of good reduction, the value χ(p) is a root of the characteristic polynomial of the Frobenius endomorphism. As a consequence, the Hasse–Weil zeta function for E is a product of two Dirichlet series, for χ and its complex conjugate.
