= Adele ring =

Concept in number theory

In number theory, the adele ring is a construction that combines all local versions of a global field into one object. For the rational numbers, these local versions include the real numbers and the fields of $p$-adic numbers for all prime numbers $p$. More generally, if $K$ is a global field, its adele ring, often denoted $\mathbb A_K$, is a topological ring built from the completions $K_v$ of $K$ at all its places $v$. Formally, it is a restricted product of the local fields $K_v$, with respect to the valuation rings at the non-archimedean places. Its elements are called adeles.

The restricted product topology makes $\mathbb A_K$ a locally compact topological ring. The field $K$ embeds diagonally in $\mathbb A_K$ as a discrete subring, and the quotient $\mathbb A_K/K$ is compact. As an additive locally compact abelian group, the adele ring is self-dual, making it a natural setting for Fourier analysis on global fields.

The group of units of the adele ring, with its natural topology, is the idele group $\mathbb A_K^\times$. The quotient $\mathbb A_K^\times/K^\times$, called the idele class group, is a central object in class field theory. Adeles and ideles are also used in Tate's thesis, the theory of automorphic forms, local-global principles, and adelic descriptions of divisors, line bundles, and principal bundles on algebraic curves.

== Definition ==
Let $K$ be a global field, meaning either a number field or a global function field. Let $v$ run over the places of $K$. For each place $v$, let $K_v$ be the completion of $K$ at $v$. If $v$ is non-archimedean, let $\mathcal O_v$ be the corresponding valuation ring.

The set of finite adeles of $K$, denoted $\mathbb A_{K,\mathrm{fin}}$, is the restricted product of the non-archimedean completions $K_v$ with respect to the subrings $\mathcal O_v$:

$$\mathbb A_{K,\mathrm{fin}}
=
{\prod_{v\,\nmid\,\infty}}' K_v
=
\Big\{
(x_v)_v\in \prod_{v\,\nmid\,\infty}K_v:
x_v\in \mathcal O_v \text{ for all but finitely many }v
\Big\}.$$

It is equipped with the restricted product topology. A basis of open sets is given by products

$$\prod_{v\,\in\,E}U_v\times \prod_{v\,\notin\,E}\mathcal O_v,$$

where $E$ is a finite set of non-archimedean places and each $U_v$ is open in $K_v$. With componentwise addition and multiplication, $\mathbb A_{K,\mathrm{fin}}$ is a topological ring.

The adele ring of $K$, denoted $\mathbb A_K$, is obtained by adjoining the completions at the archimedean places:

$$\mathbb A_K
=
\mathbb A_{K,\mathrm{fin}}
\times
\prod_{v\mid\infty}K_v
=
{\prod_{v\nmid\infty}}'K_v
\times
\prod_{v\mid\infty}K_v.$$

The number of archimedean places is finite, and each archimedean completion is isomorphic to $\mathbb R$ or $\mathbb C$. The elements of $\mathbb A_K$ are called adeles of $K$. Addition and multiplication are defined componentwise. For brevity, one often writes

$$\mathbb A_K=\prod_v'K_v,$$

with the understanding that the restricted product condition applies only at the non-archimedean places.

If $K$ is a global function field, then there are no archimedean places, so $\mathbb A_K=\mathbb A_{K,\mathrm{fin}}$.

There is a natural diagonal embedding

$$K\hookrightarrow \mathbb A_K,\qquad
a\mapsto (a,a,\ldots).$$

This map is well-defined because an element $a\in K$ lies in $\mathcal O_v$ for all but finitely many non-archimedean places $v$. After this embedding, $K$ is regarded as a subring of $\mathbb A_K$, and its elements are sometimes called the principal adeles of $\mathbb A_K$.

More generally, if $S$ is a set of places of $K$, one may define the ring of $S$-adeles by

$$\mathbb A_{K,S}:=\prod_{v\in S}'K_v,$$

again using the valuation rings $\mathcal O_v$ at the non-archimedean places in $S$. If

$$\mathbb A_K^S:=\prod_{v\notin S}'K_v,$$

then there is a natural product decomposition

$$\mathbb A_K\cong \mathbb A_{K,S}\times \mathbb A_K^S.$$

== Motivation ==
The purpose of the adele ring is to look at all completions of a global field $K$ at once. For the rational numbers, the usual absolute value gives the completion $\mathbb R$, but Ostrowski's theorem shows that there are also the $p$-adic absolute values, one for each prime number $p$. More generally, a global field has a family of completions $K_v$, one for each place $v$. The adele ring packages these completions into a single object, so that analytic methods can be applied while still retaining arithmetic information from all finite primes.

A precursor to this point of view is Minkowski's geometry of numbers. If $K$ is a number field with ring of integers $\mathcal O_K$, the classical Minkowski embedding places $\mathcal O_K$ as a lattice in the finite-dimensional real vector space

$$K\otimes_{\mathbb Q}\mathbb R\cong\mathbb R^r\times\mathbb C^s.$$

This makes it possible to study arithmetic questions using volume and compactness arguments. The adele ring may be viewed as a local-global enlargement of this construction: instead of using only the archimedean completions, it includes all completions of $K$. In the adelic setting, the global field $K$ itself embeds diagonally as a discrete subgroup of $\mathbb A_K$, and the quotient $\mathbb A_K/K$ is compact.

The adele ring is defined as a restricted product rather than as the full Cartesian product of all completions. The restricted product condition says that an adele is integral at almost all non-archimedean places. This condition is natural from the point of view of the global field itself: if $a\in K$, then $a$ belongs to $\mathcal O_v$ for all but finitely many finite places $v$. Thus the diagonal embedding

$$K\hookrightarrow \mathbb A_K$$

lands in the restricted product.

The restricted product is also the topological condition that makes the adele ring useful for analysis. With its restricted product topology, $\mathbb A_K$ is a locally compact topological ring. Local compactness gives the additive group of $\mathbb A_K$ a Haar measure, making it possible to do harmonic analysis on the adele ring. This is one of the main reasons adeles are useful in modern number theory.

Tate's thesis, for example, constructs Fourier analysis on the adele ring and integration over the idele group to give a uniform treatment of Hecke $L$-functions. In this approach, global zeta integrals factor into local integrals over the completions $K_v$, and the local-global structure of the adele ring explains the Euler product, analytic continuation, and functional equation of these $L$-functions.

== Examples ==
=== Rational adeles ===
For $K=\mathbb Q$, Ostrowski's theorem says that the places of $\mathbb Q$ are given by the usual absolute value and the $p$-adic absolute values, one for each prime number $p$. The completion at the infinite place is

$$\mathbb Q_\infty=\mathbb R,$$

and the completion at the place corresponding to $p$ is the field of $p$-adic numbers $\mathbb Q_p$, with valuation ring $\mathbb Z_p$. Thus the adele ring of $\mathbb Q$ is

$$\mathbb A_{\mathbb Q}
=
\mathbb R\times \prod_p' \mathbb Q_p,$$

where the restricted product is taken with respect to the subrings $\mathbb Z_p$. Equivalently,

$$\mathbb A_{\mathbb Q}
=
\left\{
(x_\infty,x_2,x_3,x_5,\ldots):
x_\infty\in\mathbb R,\
x_p\in\mathbb Q_p,\
x_p\in\mathbb Z_p\text{ for all but finitely many }p
\right\}.$$

Thus an adele of $\mathbb Q$ is a real number together with a $p$-adic rational number for each prime $p$, such that all but finitely many of the $p$-adic components are $p$-adic integers.

The finite adeles of $\mathbb Q$ are

$$\mathbb A_{\mathbb Q,\mathrm{fin}}
=
\prod_p'\mathbb Q_p.$$

The integral finite adeles are

$$\widehat{\mathbb Z}
=
\prod_p \mathbb Z_p,$$

the ring of profinite integers. With this notation,

$$\mathbb A_{\mathbb Q}
=
\mathbb R\times\mathbb A_{\mathbb Q,\mathrm{fin}},
\qquad
\widehat{\mathbb Z}\subset \mathbb A_{\mathbb Q,\mathrm{fin}}.$$

The diagonal embedding of $\mathbb Q$ sends a rational number $a$ to the adele

$$(a,a,a,\ldots).$$

This is well-defined because a rational number has only finitely many prime factors in its denominator, so $a\in\mathbb Z_p$ for all but finitely many primes $p$.

=== Number fields ===
Let $K$ be a number field with ring of integers $\mathcal O_K$. At each finite place $v$, the completion $K_v$ is a finite extension of some $\mathbb Q_p$, and its valuation ring is denoted $\mathcal O_v$. At each infinite place, the completion is isomorphic to either $\mathbb R$ or $\mathbb C$. The adele ring is

$$\mathbb A_K
=
\prod_{v\nmid\infty}'K_v
\times
\prod_{v\mid\infty}K_v,$$

where the restricted product over finite places is taken with respect to the rings $\mathcal O_v$. Thus an adele of $K$ is a family $(x_v)_v$ with $x_v\in K_v$ for every place $v$, such that $x_v\in\mathcal O_v$ for all but finitely many finite places.

For example, if $K$ is a quadratic number field, then its archimedean factor is either $\mathbb R^2$, when $K$ has two real embeddings, or $\mathbb C$, when $K$ has one pair of complex embeddings. The finite part is a restricted product over the nonzero prime ideals of $\mathcal O_K$.

If $L/K$ is a finite extension of number fields, then the adelic construction is compatible with extension of scalars. In particular, one has a natural isomorphism

$$\mathbb A_L\cong \mathbb A_K\otimes_K L,$$

and, in the special case $K=\mathbb Q$,

$$\mathbb A_L\cong \mathbb A_{\mathbb Q}\otimes_{\mathbb Q}L.$$

This gives another way to view the adele ring of a number field as the adelic extension of the rational adele ring.

=== Function fields and curves ===
Now take the function field

$$K=\mathbb F_q(\mathbb P^1)=\mathbb F_q(t)$$

of the projective line over a finite field. Its places correspond to the closed points $x$ of $X=\mathbb P^1$. Such points may be described as maps

$$x:\operatorname{Spec}\mathbb F_{q^n}\longrightarrow \mathbb P^1$$

over $\operatorname{Spec}\mathbb F_q$. For instance, there are $q+1$ points of the form

$$\operatorname{Spec}\mathbb F_q\longrightarrow \mathbb P^1.$$

For a point $x$, the local ring used in the restricted product is the completed local ring

$$\widehat{\mathcal O}_{X,x},$$

and the corresponding local field is its fraction field, often denoted $K_{X,x}$. Thus the adele ring of $\mathbb F_q(\mathbb P^1)$ may be written

$$\mathbb A_{\mathbb F_q(\mathbb P^1)}
=
\prod_{x\in X}' K_{X,x},$$

where the restricted product is taken with respect to the completed local rings $\widehat{\mathcal O}_{X,x}$. Equivalently, its elements are families $(f_x)_x$, with $f_x\in K_{X,x}$, such that $f_x\in\widehat{\mathcal O}_{X,x}$ for all but finitely many points $x$.

The same description holds for any smooth proper curve $X/\mathbb F_q$ over a finite field. If $K=\mathbb F_q(X)$ is its function field, then

$$\mathbb A_K
=
\prod_{x\in X}' K_{X,x},$$

where $x$ runs over the closed points of $X$. Unlike number fields, global function fields have no archimedean places, so the finite adele ring and the full adele ring are the same.

== Topology and main properties ==
The topology on the adele ring is the restricted product topology. For a finite set of places $P$ containing the archimedean places, define

$$\mathbb A_K(P)
:=
\prod_{v\in P}K_v
\times
\prod_{v\notin P}\mathcal O_v.$$

Equipped with the product topology and componentwise addition and multiplication, $\mathbb A_K(P)$ is a locally compact topological ring. If $P'$ is another finite set of places of $K$ containing $P$, then $\mathbb A_K(P)$ is an open subring of $\mathbb A_K(P')$. The adele ring is the union of all these open subrings:

$$\mathbb A_K
=
\bigcup_{P\supset P_\infty,\ |P|<\infty}
\mathbb A_K(P).$$

Equivalently, $\mathbb A_K$ is the set of all $x=(x_v)_v$ such that $|x_v|_v\leq 1$ for almost all non-archimedean places $v$. The topology of $\mathbb A_K$ is induced by the requirement that all $\mathbb A_K(P)$ be open subrings. Thus $\mathbb A_K$ is a locally compact topological ring.

The same construction applies to sets of places. For every set of places $S$, the ring of $S$-adeles

$$\mathbb A_{K,S}=\prod_{v\in S}'K_v$$

is a locally compact topological ring, with the restricted product topology. If

$$\mathbb A_K^S=\prod_{v\notin S}'K_v,$$

then there is a natural product decomposition

$$\mathbb A_K\cong \mathbb A_{K,S}\times \mathbb A_K^S.$$

The diagonal embedding

$$K\hookrightarrow \mathbb A_K,\qquad
a\mapsto (a,a,\ldots)$$

identifies $K$ with a subring of $\mathbb A_K$. With this embedding, the elements of $K$ are called principal adeles. The image of $K$ is discrete in $\mathbb A_K$, and the quotient

$$\mathbb A_K/K$$

is compact. In particular, $K$ is closed in $\mathbb A_K$. This compactness property is one of the main reasons the adele ring is useful in harmonic analysis and in arithmetic applications.

The adele ring also separates naturally into any chosen local factor and the remaining factors. Fix a place $v$ of $K$. Let $P$ be a finite set of places containing $v$ and $P_\infty$, and define

$$\mathbb A_K'(P,v)
:=
\prod_{w\in P\setminus\{v\}}K_w
\times
\prod_{w\notin P}\mathcal O_w.$$

Then

$$\mathbb A_K(P)\cong K_v\times \mathbb A_K'(P,v).$$

Furthermore, define

$$\mathbb A_K'(v)
:=
\bigcup_{P\supset P_\infty\cup\{v\}}
\mathbb A_K'(P,v),$$

where $P$ runs through all finite sets containing $P_\infty\cup\{v\}$. Then

$$\mathbb A_K\cong K_v\times \mathbb A_K'(v),$$

via the map

$$(a_w)_w\mapsto (a_v,(a_w)_{w\neq v}).$$

Thus there is a natural embedding $K_v\hookrightarrow \mathbb A_K$ and a natural projection $\mathbb A_K\twoheadrightarrow K_v$. The same construction works with any finite set of places in place of the single place $v$.

Since $\mathbb A_K$ is locally compact as an additive group, it has an additive Haar measure. This measure is used in harmonic analysis on global fields and is usually normalized as a product of local Haar measures. With the standard normalization at the non-archimedean places, the valuation ring $\mathcal O_v$ has measure $1$ for almost all finite places.

== Haar measure and Fourier analysis ==
Since $\mathbb A_K$ is locally compact as an additive group, it has an additive Haar measure, usually denoted $dx$. This measure may be normalized as a product of local Haar measures on the completions $K_v$. At a non-archimedean place $v$, the local measure $dx_v$ is commonly normalized so that the valuation ring $\mathcal O_v$ has measure $1$; at the archimedean places one uses the usual Lebesgue measure on $\mathbb R$ or $\mathbb C$.

A function $f:\mathbb A_K\to\mathbb C$ is called simple if

$$f=\prod_v f_v,$$

where each $f_v:K_v\to\mathbb C$ is measurable and $f_v=\mathbf 1_{\mathcal O_v}$ for almost all non-archimedean places $v$. With the standard normalization, every integrable simple function satisfies

$$\int_{\mathbb A_K} f\,dx
=
\prod_v \int_{K_v} f_v\,dx_v.$$

The product is finite in the sense that almost all factors are equal to $1$.

Fourier analysis on the adele ring is based on the characters of its additive group. If $G$ is a locally compact abelian group, its character group $\widehat G$ is the group of all continuous homomorphisms from $G$ to

$$\mathbb T=\{z\in\mathbb C:|z|=1\},$$

with the topology of uniform convergence on compact subsets. The adele ring is self-dual as a locally compact abelian group:

$$\mathbb A_K\cong \widehat{\mathbb A_K}.$$

This is proved by reducing to the corresponding local statement for each completion $K_v$. For example, the usual character

$$e_\infty(t)=\exp(2\pi i t)$$

gives an isomorphism

$$\mathbb R\longrightarrow \widehat{\mathbb R},\qquad
s\mapsto \bigl(t\mapsto e_\infty(ts)\bigr).$$

Analogous local characters are used at the non-archimedean places, and their restricted product gives the global self-duality of $\mathbb A_K$.

After choosing a nontrivial additive character $\chi:\mathbb A_K\to\mathbb T$, the Fourier transform of a suitable function $f$ on $\mathbb A_K$ is defined by

$$\widehat f(y)
=
\int_{\mathbb A_K} f(x)\chi(xy)\,dx.$$

With a compatible choice of Haar measure, this Fourier transform satisfies the usual inversion and Plancherel formulas. One of the important features of the adelic setting is that global Fourier analysis factors into local Fourier analysis over the completions $K_v$.

With the help of the characters of $\mathbb A_K$, Fourier analysis can be done on the adele ring. In Tate's thesis, John Tate used Fourier analysis on the adele ring and integration over the idele group to study the Riemann zeta function, Dirichlet $L$-functions, and more general Hecke $L$-functions. Adelic forms of these functions can be represented as integrals over the adele ring or the idele group, with respect to corresponding Haar measures. Their functional equations and meromorphic continuations can then be proved by applying Fourier analysis and Poisson summation in the adelic setting.

For example, for $\operatorname{Re}(s)>1$,

$$\int_{\widehat{\mathbb Z}} |x|^s\,d^\times x
=
\zeta(s),$$

where $d^\times x$ is the multiplicative Haar measure on the finite idele group $I_{\mathbb Q,\mathrm{fin}}$, normalized so that $\widehat{\mathbb Z}^{\times}$ has volume $1$, and extended by zero to the finite adele ring. Thus the Riemann zeta function can be written as an integral over a subset of the adele ring.

== Applications ==
=== Class field theory ===
The adele ring enters class field theory through its group of units, the idele group $\mathbb A_K^\times$. The quotient

$$C_K=\mathbb A_K^\times/K^\times$$

is the idele class group of $K$. Global class field theory describes the abelian extensions of $K$ in terms of topological quotients of $C_K$. In one formulation, the global Artin reciprocity law gives a reciprocity homomorphism from the idele class group to the Galois group of the maximal abelian extension of $K$. At finite level, for a finite abelian extension $L/K$, the corresponding quotient of $C_K$ is described using the norm subgroup from $C_L$.

This adelic formulation packages the local reciprocity maps of local class field theory into a global statement. It replaces the older ideal-theoretic formulation, involving ideal class groups and ray class groups, by a statement about the topology and quotients of the idele class group.

=== Ideal classes and units ===
The idele group gives a topological refinement of the group of fractional ideals of a number field. For a number field $K$, the finite part of the idele group maps onto the group of fractional ideals by

$$(x_{\mathfrak p})_{\mathfrak p}
\longmapsto
\prod_{\mathfrak p}\mathfrak p^{v_{\mathfrak p}(x_{\mathfrak p})}.$$

The kernel is the product of the local unit groups. Consequently, the ordinary ideal class group can be recovered as a quotient of the idele class group. This viewpoint gives an adelic interpretation of the finiteness of the class number: the compactness of the norm-one idele classes implies that the ideal class group is compact, and since it is discrete, it is finite.

The same circle of ideas also gives an adelic formulation of the unit theorem. If $P$ is a finite set of places containing the archimedean places, the group of $P$-units appears as an intersection of $K^\times$ with a natural open subgroup of the idele group. In particular, for a number field $K$, Dirichlet's unit theorem states that

$$\mathcal O_K^\times \cong \mu(K)\times \mathbb Z^{r+s-1},$$

where $\mu(K)$ is the finite cyclic group of roots of unity in $K$, $r$ is the number of real embeddings, and $s$ is the number of conjugate pairs of complex embeddings.

=== Tate's thesis and L-functions ===
The topology on $\mathbb A_K$ makes the quotient $\mathbb A_K/K$ compact, allowing one to do harmonic analysis on the adele ring. With the help of the characters of $\mathbb A_K$, Fourier analysis can be done on the adele ring; integration over the idele group then gives zeta integrals.

In Tate's thesis, John Tate used Fourier analysis on the adele ring and the idele group to study the Riemann zeta function, Dirichlet $L$-functions, and more general Hecke $L$-functions. Adelic forms of these functions can be represented as integrals over the adele ring or the idele group, with respect to corresponding Haar measures. Their functional equations and meromorphic continuations can then be proved using Fourier analysis and Poisson summation in the adelic setting.

For example, for $\operatorname{Re}(s)>1$, one has an adelic integral representation of the Riemann zeta function,

$$\int_{\widehat{\mathbb Z}} |x|^s\,d^\times x=\zeta(s),$$

where $d^\times x$ is the multiplicative Haar measure on the finite idele group $I_{\mathbb Q,\mathrm{fin}}$, normalized so that $\widehat{\mathbb Z}^{\times}$ has volume $1$, and extended by zero to the finite adele ring. Thus the Riemann zeta function can be written as an integral over a subset of the adele ring.

=== Automorphic forms ===
Adeles also provide the natural language for automorphic forms. Instead of studying functions separately over the real, complex, and $p$-adic points of an algebraic group, one studies functions on adelic groups such as $G(\mathbb A_K)$. For example, automorphic forms for $\operatorname{GL}_2$ over $\mathbb Q$ may be viewed as functions on

$$\operatorname{GL}_2(\mathbb Q)\backslash \operatorname{GL}_2(\mathbb A_{\mathbb Q})$$

satisfying suitable algebraic, analytic, and growth conditions. In this setting, automorphic $L$-functions can often be described by integrals over adelic groups.

More generally, the use of adelic points $G(\mathbb A_K)$ for reductive algebraic groups $G$ is central in the modern theory of automorphic representations. This viewpoint is also one of the starting points of the Langlands program, which relates automorphic representations of adelic groups to Galois representations.

=== Approximation and local-global principles ===
The adele ring provides a unified interpretation of approximation theorems and local-global questions. The weak approximation theorem says that, for finitely many inequivalent valuations of $K$, the diagonal image of $K$ is dense in the product of the corresponding completions. The strong approximation theorem says that, after omitting one place $v_0$, the field $K$ is dense in the restricted product over all other places. Thus the global field is discrete in its full adele ring, but becomes dense when one place is omitted.

Adelic language is also used to formulate local-global principles, such as the Hasse principle. In such problems one compares solutions over the global field $K$ with compatible families of solutions over all completions $K_v$. The adele ring provides a single space in which these local conditions can be collected and studied together.

=== Curves, divisors, and bundles ===
For a smooth proper curve $X/\mathbb F_q$ with function field $K$, the adele ring of $K$ can be described using the completions at the closed points of $X$. In this setting, ideles recover the divisor and Picard groups of the curve. One has

$$\operatorname{Div}(X)=\mathbb A_X^\times/\mathbb O_X^\times$$

and

$$\operatorname{Pic}(X)
=
K^\times\backslash \mathbb A_X^\times/\mathbb O_X^\times .$$

Thus the divisor-class description of line bundles on a curve can be expressed adelically.

More generally, for an algebraic group $G$, adelic double quotients describe moduli of bundles on curves. In Weil uniformization, for suitable groups such as semisimple groups, and also for $\operatorname{GL}_n$, one has an adelic description of the form

$$\operatorname{Bun}_G(X)
=
G(K)\backslash G(\mathbb A_X)/G(\mathbb O_X).$$

For $G=\mathbb G_m$, this recovers the adelic description of the Picard group.

=== Serre duality on curves ===
Adeles also occur in the cohomology of algebraic curves. If $X$ is a smooth proper curve over the complex numbers, one can define the adeles of its function field $\mathbb C(X)$ in a way analogous to the function-field case over finite fields. Tate proved that Serre duality on $X$,

$$H^1(X,\mathcal L)
\simeq
H^0(X,\Omega_X\otimes\mathcal L^{-1})^*,$$

can be deduced by working with this adele ring $\mathbb A_{\mathbb C(X)}$, where $\mathcal L$ is a line bundle on $X$.

== Idele group ==
The idele group of a global field $K$ is the group of invertible elements of the adele ring $\mathbb A_K$. It is usually denoted

$$\mathbb A_K^\times$$

or $I_K$. Equivalently, it is the restricted direct product

$$\mathbb A_K^\times=\prod_v' K_v^\times$$

of the multiplicative groups of the completions $K_v$, taken with respect to the unit groups $\mathcal O_v^\times$ at the non-archimedean places. Thus an idele is a family $x=(x_v)_v$, with $x_v\in K_v^\times$ for every place $v$, such that $x_v\in\mathcal O_v^\times$ for all but finitely many non-archimedean $v$.

Although $\mathbb A_K^\times$ is the group of units of the adele ring, it is not given the subspace topology inherited from $\mathbb A_K$. Instead it is given the restricted product topology, equivalently the topology induced by the embedding

$$\mathbb A_K^\times\longrightarrow \mathbb A_K\times\mathbb A_K,\qquad
x\mapsto (x,x^{-1}).$$

With this topology, $\mathbb A_K^\times$ is an abelian locally compact topological group.

The diagonal embedding of $K^\times$ into $\mathbb A_K^\times$ gives the subgroup of principal ideles. The quotient

$$C_K=\mathbb A_K^\times/K^\times$$

is the idele class group. This group is a central object in class field theory, where abelian extensions of $K$ are described in terms of topological quotients of $C_K$.

The idele group also carries a natural absolute value, or module,

$$|x|_{\mathbb A}=\prod_v |x_v|_v,$$

where the local absolute values are normalized in the standard way. The product is finite for ideles, since almost all finite components are units. The subgroup

$$\mathbb A_K^1=\{x\in\mathbb A_K^\times: |x|_{\mathbb A}=1\}$$

is the group of norm-one ideles. By the product formula, $K^\times$ lies in $\mathbb A_K^1$, and the quotient $\mathbb A_K^1/K^\times$ is compact.

For number fields, the finite part of the idele group maps naturally onto the group of fractional ideals by

$$(x_{\mathfrak p})_{\mathfrak p}
\longmapsto
\prod_{\mathfrak p}\mathfrak p^{v_{\mathfrak p}(x_{\mathfrak p})}.$$

The kernel is $\widehat{\mathcal O}_K^\times$, so the ordinary ideal class group is recovered as a quotient of the idele class group. In this way, the idele class group refines the ideal class group by retaining local unit data and archimedean information.

Ideles are also used in harmonic analysis on global fields. In Tate's thesis, integration over the adele ring and the idele group gives a uniform treatment of Hecke $L$-functions, including their Euler products, analytic continuation, and functional equations.

== Further properties and proof sketches ==
The preceding sections give the basic definition and main uses of the adele ring. This section records some standard structural facts and proof sketches.

=== Restricted product topology ===
The difference between the restricted and unrestricted product topologies can be illustrated using a sequence in $\mathbb A_\mathbb Q$.

Lemma. Consider the following sequence in $\mathbb A_\mathbb Q$:

$$\begin{align}
x_1&=\left(\frac 1 2 ,1,1,\ldots\right)\\
x_2&=\left(1,\frac 1 3 ,1,\ldots\right)\\
x_3&=\left(1,1,\frac 1 5 ,1,\ldots\right)\\
x_4&=\left(1,1,1,\frac 1 7 ,1,\ldots\right)\\
& \vdots
\end{align}$$

In the product topology this converges to $(1,1,\ldots)$, but it does not converge at all in the restricted product topology.

Proof. In product topology convergence corresponds to the convergence in each coordinate, which is trivial because the sequences become stationary. The sequence does not converge in restricted product topology. For each adele $a=(a_p)_p \in \mathbb A_\mathbb Q$ and for each restricted open rectangle $\textstyle U=\prod_{p \in E}U_p \times \prod_{p \notin E}\mathbb Z_p,$ it has $\tfrac{1}{p}-a_p \notin \mathbb Z_p$ for $a_p \in \mathbb Z_p$ and therefore $\tfrac{1}{p}-a_p \notin \mathbb Z_p$ for all $p \notin F.$ As a result, $x_n-a \notin U$ for almost all $n \in \mathbb N.$ In this consideration, $E$ and $F$ are finite subsets of the set of all places.

=== Alternative descriptions for number fields ===
The profinite integers are defined as the profinite completion of the rings $\mathbb Z /n\mathbb Z$ with the partial order $n \geq m \Leftrightarrow m | n,$ i.e.,

$$\widehat{\mathbb Z}:=\varprojlim_n \mathbb Z /n\mathbb Z.$$

Lemma. $\textstyle \widehat{\mathbb Z} \cong \prod_p \mathbb Z_p.$

Proof. This follows from the Chinese Remainder Theorem.

Lemma. $\mathbb A_{\mathbb Q, \mathrm{fin}}= \widehat{\mathbb Z}\otimes_{\mathbb Z} \mathbb Q.$

Proof. Use the universal property of the tensor product. Define a $\mathbb Z$-bilinear function

$$\begin{cases}
\Psi: \widehat{\mathbb Z}\times \mathbb Q \to \mathbb A_{\mathbb Q,\mathrm{fin}} \\
\left ((a_p)_p,q \right ) \mapsto (a_pq)_p .
\end{cases}$$

This is well-defined because for a given $q = \tfrac{m}{n} \in \mathbb Q$ with $m,n$ coprime there are only finitely many primes dividing $n.$ Let $M$ be another $\mathbb Z$-module with a $\mathbb Z$-bilinear map $\Phi: \widehat{\mathbb Z} \times \mathbb Q \to M.$ It must be the case that $\Phi$ factors through $\Psi$ uniquely, i.e., there exists a unique $\mathbb Z$-linear map $\tilde{\Phi}: \mathbb A_{\mathbb Q,\mathrm{fin}} \to M$ such that $\Phi = \tilde{\Phi} \circ \Psi.$ $\tilde{\Phi}$ can be defined as follows: for a given $(u_p)_p$ there exist $u \in \mathbb N$ and $(v_p)_p \in \widehat{\mathbb Z}$ such that $u_p=\tfrac{1}{u}\cdot v_p$ for all $p.$ Define $\tilde{\Phi}((u_p)_p) := \Phi((v_p)_p, \tfrac{1}{u}).$ One can show $\tilde{\Phi}$ is well-defined, $\mathbb Z$-linear, satisfies $\Phi = \tilde{\Phi} \circ \Psi$ and is unique with these properties.

Corollary. Define $\mathbb A_\mathbb Z := \widehat{\mathbb Z} \times \mathbb R.$ This results in an algebraic isomorphism $\mathbb A_\mathbb Q \cong \mathbb A_\mathbb Z\otimes_{\mathbb Z} \mathbb Q.$

Proof.

$$\mathbb A_\mathbb Z \otimes_\mathbb Z \mathbb Q
=
\left(\widehat{\mathbb Z}\times \mathbb R \right)\otimes_\mathbb Z \mathbb Q
\cong
\left(\widehat{\mathbb Z} \otimes_\mathbb Z \mathbb Q \right)\times (\mathbb R \otimes_\mathbb Z \mathbb Q)
\cong
\left(\widehat{\mathbb Z}\otimes_{\mathbb Z} \mathbb Q \right) \times \mathbb R
=
\mathbb A_{\mathbb Q,\mathrm{fin}} \times \mathbb R
=
\mathbb A_\mathbb Q.$$

Lemma. For a number field $K$, $\mathbb A_K=\mathbb A_\mathbb Q\otimes_\mathbb Q K.$

Remark. Using $\mathbb A_\mathbb Q\otimes_\mathbb Q K \cong \mathbb A_\mathbb Q \oplus \dots \oplus \mathbb A_\mathbb Q,$ where there are $[K:\mathbb Q]$ summands, the right side receives the product topology and this topology is transported via the isomorphism onto $\mathbb A_\mathbb Q\otimes_\mathbb Q K.$

=== Finite extensions ===
If $L/K$ is a finite extension, then $L$ is a global field. Thus $\mathbb A_L$ is defined, and $\textstyle \mathbb A_L= {\prod_v}' L_v.$ The ring $\mathbb A_K$ can be identified with a subring of $\mathbb A_L.$ Map $a=(a_v)_v \in \mathbb A_K$ to $a'=(a'_w)_w \in \mathbb A_L$, where $a'_w=a_v \in K_v \subset L_w$ for $w|v.$ Then $a=(a_w)_w \in \mathbb A_L$ is in the subring $\mathbb A_K$ if $a_w \in K_v$ for $w | v$ and $a_w=a_{w'}$ for all $w,w'$ lying above the same place $v$ of $K.$

Lemma. If $L/K$ is a finite extension, then $\mathbb A_L\cong\mathbb A_K \otimes_K L$ both algebraically and topologically.

With the help of this isomorphism, the inclusion $\mathbb A_K \subset \mathbb A_L$ is given by

$$\begin{cases}
\mathbb A_K \to \mathbb A_L\\
\alpha \mapsto \alpha \otimes_K 1.
\end{cases}$$

Furthermore, the principal adeles in $\mathbb A_K$ can be identified with a subgroup of principal adeles in $\mathbb A_L$ via the natural embedding $K\to L.$

Proof. Let $\omega_1,\ldots, \omega_n$ be a basis of $L$ over $K.$ Then for almost all $v,$

$$\widetilde{O_v} \cong O_v\omega_1 \oplus \cdots \oplus O_v \omega_n.$$

Furthermore, there are the following isomorphisms:

$$K_v\omega_1 \oplus \cdots \oplus K_v \omega_n \cong K_v \otimes_K L \cong L_v=\prod\nolimits_{w | v} L_w.$$

For the second use the map

$$\begin{cases}
K_v \otimes_K L \to L_v\\
\alpha_v \otimes a \mapsto (\alpha_v \cdot (\tau_w(a)))_w
\end{cases}$$

in which $\tau_w : L \to L_w$ is the canonical embedding and $w | v.$ The restricted product is taken on both sides with respect to $\widetilde{O_v}:$

$$\begin{align}
\mathbb A_K \otimes_K L
&=
\left ({\prod_v}' K_v \right ) \otimes_K L\\
&\cong {\prod_v}' (K_v\omega_1 \oplus \cdots \oplus K_v \omega_n)\\
&\cong {\prod_v}' (K_v \otimes_K L)\\
&\cong {\prod_v}' L_v \\
&=\mathbb A_L.
\end{align}$$

Corollary. As additive groups $\mathbb A_L \cong \mathbb A_K \oplus \cdots \oplus \mathbb A_K,$ where the right side has $[L:K]$ summands.

The set of principal adeles in $\mathbb A_L$ is identified with the set $K \oplus \cdots \oplus K$, where the left side has $[L:K]$ summands and $K$ is considered as a subset of $\mathbb A_K.$

=== Adeles of vector spaces and algebras ===
Let $E$ be a finite-dimensional vector space over $K$ and $\{\omega_1,\ldots,\omega_n\}$ a basis for $E$ over $K.$ For each place $v$ of $K$:

$$\begin{align}
E_v &:=E \otimes_K K_v \cong K_v\omega_1 \oplus \cdots \oplus K_v\omega_n,\\
\widetilde{O_v} &:=O_v\omega_1 \oplus \cdots \oplus O_v\omega_n.
\end{align}$$

The adele ring of $E$ is defined as

$$\mathbb A_E:= {\prod_v}' E_v.$$

This definition is based on the alternative description of the adele ring as a tensor product equipped with the same topology that was defined when giving an alternate definition of the adele ring for number fields. Next, $\mathbb A_E$ is equipped with the restricted product topology. Then $\mathbb A_E = E \otimes_K \mathbb A_K$ and $E$ is embedded in $\mathbb A_E$ naturally via the map $e \mapsto e \otimes 1.$

An alternative definition of the topology on $\mathbb A_E$ can be provided. Consider all linear maps $E \to K.$ Using the natural embeddings $E \to \mathbb A_E$ and $K \to \mathbb A_K,$ extend these linear maps to $\mathbb A_E \to \mathbb A_K.$ The topology on $\mathbb A_E$ is the coarsest topology for which all these extensions are continuous.

The topology can be defined in a different way. Fixing a basis for $E$ over $K$ results in an isomorphism $E \cong K^n.$ Therefore, fixing a basis induces an isomorphism $(\mathbb A_K)^n \cong \mathbb A_E.$ The left-hand side is supplied with the product topology and this topology is transported with the isomorphism onto the right-hand side. The topology does not depend on the choice of the basis, because another basis defines a second isomorphism. By composing both isomorphisms, a linear homeomorphism which transfers the two topologies into each other is obtained. More formally,

$$\begin{align}
\mathbb A_E
&= E \otimes_K \mathbb A_K\\
&\cong (K \otimes_K \mathbb A_K) \oplus \cdots \oplus (K \otimes_K \mathbb A_K)\\
&\cong \mathbb A_K \oplus \cdots \oplus \mathbb A_K,
\end{align}$$

where the sums have $n$ summands. In case of $E=L,$ the definition above is consistent with the results about the adele ring of a finite extension $L/K.$

Let $A$ be a finite-dimensional algebra over $K.$ In particular, $A$ is a finite-dimensional vector space over $K.$ As a consequence, $\mathbb A_A$ is defined and $\mathbb A_A \cong \mathbb A_K \otimes_K A.$ Since there is multiplication on $\mathbb A_K$ and $A,$ a multiplication on $\mathbb A_A$ can be defined via

$$\forall \alpha,\beta\in\mathbb A_K
\text{ and }
\forall a,b\in A:
\qquad
(\alpha\otimes_K a)\cdot(\beta\otimes_K b):=(\alpha\beta)\otimes_K(ab).$$

As a consequence, $\mathbb A_A$ is an algebra with a unit over $\mathbb A_K.$ Let $\mathcal B$ be a finite subset of $A$, containing a basis for $A$ over $K.$ For any finite place $v$, $M_v$ is defined as the $O_v$-module generated by $\mathcal B$ in $A_v.$ For each finite set of places $P\supset P_{\infty},$ define

$$\mathbb A_A(P,\alpha)
=
\prod_{v\in P}A_v
\times
\prod_{v\notin P}M_v.$$

One can show there is a finite set $P_0$ so that $\mathbb A_A(P,\alpha)$ is an open subring of $\mathbb A_A$, if $P\supset P_0.$ Furthermore $\mathbb A_A$ is the union of all these subrings and for $A=K$, the definition above is consistent with the definition of the adele ring.

=== Trace and norm ===
Let $L/K$ be a finite extension. Since $\mathbb A_K=\mathbb A_K \otimes_K K$ and $\mathbb A_L=\mathbb A_K \otimes_K L$ from the lemma above, $\mathbb A_K$ can be interpreted as a closed subring of $\mathbb A_L.$ For this embedding, write $\operatorname{con}_{L/K}$. Explicitly, for all places $w$ of $L$ above $v$ and for any $\alpha \in \mathbb A_K$,

$$(\operatorname{con}_{L/K}(\alpha))_w=\alpha_v\in K_v.$$

Let $M/L/K$ be a tower of global fields. Then

$$\operatorname{con}_{M/K}(\alpha)
=
\operatorname{con}_{M/L}(\operatorname{con}_{L/K}(\alpha))
\qquad
\forall \alpha \in \mathbb A_K.$$

Furthermore, restricted to the principal adeles $\operatorname{con}$ is the natural injection $K \to L.$

Let $\{\omega_1,\ldots,\omega_n\}$ be a basis of the field extension $L/K.$ Then each $\alpha \in \mathbb A_L$ can be written as $\textstyle \sum_{j=1}^n \alpha_j \omega_j$, where $\alpha_j \in \mathbb A_K$ are unique. The map $\alpha \mapsto \alpha_j$ is continuous. Define $\alpha_{ij}$, depending on $\alpha$, via the equations

$$\begin{align}
\alpha \omega_1 &=\sum_{j=1}^n \alpha_{1j} \omega_j,\\
&\vdots \\
\alpha \omega_n &=\sum_{j=1}^n \alpha_{nj} \omega_j.
\end{align}$$

Now define the trace and norm of $\alpha$ as

$$\begin{align}
\operatorname{Tr}_{L/K}(\alpha)
&:= \operatorname{Tr} ((\alpha_{ij})_{i,j})=\sum_{i=1}^n \alpha_{ii},\\
N_{L/K}(\alpha)
&:= N ((\alpha_{ij})_{i,j})=\det((\alpha_{ij})_{i,j}).
\end{align}$$

These are the trace and the determinant of the linear map

$$\begin{cases}
\mathbb A_L \to \mathbb A_L\\
x \mapsto \alpha x.
\end{cases}$$

They are continuous maps on the adele ring, and they fulfil the usual equations:

$$\begin{align}
\operatorname{Tr}_{L/K}(\alpha+\beta)
&=\operatorname{Tr}_{L/K}(\alpha)+\operatorname{Tr}_{L/K}(\beta)
&& \forall \alpha,\beta\in\mathbb A_L,\\
\operatorname{Tr}_{L/K}(\operatorname{con}(\alpha))
&=n\alpha
&& \forall \alpha\in\mathbb A_K,\\
N_{L/K}(\alpha\beta)
&=N_{L/K}(\alpha)N_{L/K}(\beta)
&& \forall \alpha,\beta\in\mathbb A_L,\\
N_{L/K}(\operatorname{con}(\alpha))
&=\alpha^n
&& \forall \alpha\in\mathbb A_K.
\end{align}$$

Furthermore, for $\alpha \in L$, $\operatorname{Tr}_{L/K}(\alpha)$ and $N_{L/K}(\alpha)$ are identical to the trace and norm of the field extension $L/K.$ For a tower of fields $M/L/K$, the result is

$$\begin{align}
\operatorname{Tr}_{L/K}(\operatorname{Tr}_{M/L}(\alpha))
&=
\operatorname{Tr}_{M/K}(\alpha)
&& \forall \alpha\in\mathbb A_M,\\
N_{L/K}(N_{M/L}(\alpha))
&=
N_{M/K}(\alpha)
&& \forall \alpha\in\mathbb A_M.
\end{align}$$

Moreover, it can be proven that:

$$\begin{align}
\operatorname{Tr}_{L/K}(\alpha)
&=
\left(
\sum_{w|v}\operatorname{Tr}_{L_w/K_v}(\alpha_w)
\right)_v
&& \forall \alpha\in\mathbb A_L,\\
N_{L/K}(\alpha)
&=
\left(
\prod_{w|v}N_{L_w/K_v}(\alpha_w)
\right)_v
&& \forall \alpha\in\mathbb A_L.
\end{align}$$

=== Discreteness and compactness of the diagonal image ===
Theorem. $K$ is discrete and cocompact in $\mathbb A_K.$ In particular, $K$ is closed in $\mathbb A_K.$

Proof. Prove the case $K=\mathbb Q.$ To show $\mathbb Q\subset \mathbb A_\mathbb Q$ is discrete it is sufficient to show the existence of a neighbourhood of $0$ which contains no other rational number. The general case follows via translation. Define

$$U:=
\left\{
(\alpha_p)_p :
\forall p<\infty,\ |\alpha_p|_p\leq 1
\quad\text{and}\quad
|\alpha_\infty|_\infty<1
\right\}
=
\widehat{\mathbb Z}\times(-1,1).$$

$U$ is an open neighbourhood of $0 \in \mathbb A_\mathbb Q.$ It is claimed that $U\cap \mathbb Q=\{0\}.$ Let $\beta\in U\cap\mathbb Q.$ Then $\beta\in\mathbb Q$ and $|\beta|_p\leq 1$ for all $p$, and therefore $\beta\in\mathbb Z.$ Additionally, $\beta\in(-1,1)$ and therefore $\beta=0.$

Next, to show compactness, define

$$W:=
\left\{
(\alpha_p)_p :
\forall p<\infty,\ |\alpha_p|_p\leq 1
\quad\text{and}\quad
|\alpha_\infty|_\infty\leq \frac{1}{2}
\right\}
=
\widehat{\mathbb Z}\times
\left[-\frac12,\frac12\right].$$

Each element in $\mathbb A_\mathbb Q/\mathbb Q$ has a representative in $W$, that is, for each $\alpha\in\mathbb A_\mathbb Q$, there exists $\beta\in\mathbb Q$ such that $\alpha-\beta\in W.$ Let $\alpha=(\alpha_p)_p\in\mathbb A_\mathbb Q$ be arbitrary and $p$ be a prime for which $|\alpha_p|>1.$ Then there exists $r_p=z_p/p^{x_p}$, with $z_p\in\mathbb Z$ and $x_p\in\mathbb N$, such that $|\alpha_p-r_p|\leq 1.$ Replace $\alpha$ with $\alpha-r_p$ and let $q\neq p$ be another prime. Then

$$\left|\alpha_q-r_p\right|_q
\leq
\max\left\{|\alpha_q|_q,|r_p|_q\right\}
\leq
\max\left\{|\alpha_q|_q,1\right\}
\leq 1.$$

Next, it can be claimed that

$$|\alpha_q-r_p|_q \leq 1
\Longleftrightarrow
|\alpha_q|_q \leq 1.$$

The reverse implication is trivially true. The implication is true because the two terms of the strong triangle inequality are equal if the absolute values of both integers are different. As a consequence, the finite set of primes for which the components of $\alpha$ are not in $\mathbb Z_p$ is reduced by one. With iteration, it can be deduced that there exists $r\in\mathbb Q$ such that $\alpha-r\in\widehat{\mathbb Z}\times\mathbb R.$ Now select $s\in\mathbb Z$ such that $\alpha_\infty-r-s\in[-\tfrac12,\tfrac12].$ Then $\alpha-(r+s)\in W.$ The continuous projection $\pi:W\to\mathbb A_\mathbb Q/\mathbb Q$ is surjective, therefore $\mathbb A_\mathbb Q/\mathbb Q$, as the continuous image of a compact set, is compact.

Corollary. Let $E$ be a finite-dimensional vector space over $K.$ Then $E$ is discrete and cocompact in $\mathbb A_E.$

=== Approximation theorems ===
Weak Approximation Theorem. Let $|\cdot|_1,\ldots,|\cdot|_N$ be inequivalent valuations of $K.$ Let $K_n$ be the completion of $K$ with respect to $|\cdot|_n.$ Embed $K$ diagonally in $K_1\times\cdots\times K_N.$ Then $K$ is everywhere dense in $K_1\times\cdots\times K_N.$ In other words, for each $\varepsilon>0$ and for each $(\alpha_1,\ldots,\alpha_N)\in K_1\times\cdots\times K_N$, there exists $\xi\in K$ such that

$$\forall n\in\{1,\ldots,N\}:\quad
|\alpha_n-\xi|_n<\varepsilon.$$

Strong Approximation Theorem. Let $v_0$ be a place of $K.$ Define

$$V:={\prod_{v\neq v_0}}'K_v.$$

Then $K$ is dense in $V.$

Remark. The global field is discrete in its adele ring. The strong approximation theorem tells us that, if one place or more is omitted, the property of discreteness of $K$ is turned into a denseness of $K.$

=== Arithmetic consequences ===
Theorem (finiteness of the class number of a number field). Let $K$ be a number field. Then $|\operatorname{Cl}_K|<\infty.$

Proof. The map

$$\begin{cases}
I_K^1 \to J_K\\
\left((\alpha_v)_{v<\infty},(\alpha_v)_{v|\infty}\right)
\mapsto
\prod_{v<\infty}\mathfrak p_v^{v(\alpha_v)}
\end{cases}$$

is surjective and therefore $\operatorname{Cl}_K$ is the continuous image of the compact set $I_K^1/K^\times.$ Thus $\operatorname{Cl}_K$ is compact. In addition, it is discrete and so finite.

Remark. There is a similar result for the case of a global function field. In this case, the so-called divisor group is defined. It can be shown that the quotient of the set of all divisors of degree $0$ by the set of the principal divisors is a finite group.

Let $P\supset P_\infty$ be a finite set of places. Define

$$\begin{align}
\Omega(P)
&:=
\prod_{v\in P}K_v^\times
\times
\prod_{v\notin P}O_v^\times
=
(\mathbb A_K(P))^\times,\\
E(P)
&:=
K^\times\cap\Omega(P).
\end{align}$$

Then $E(P)$ is a subgroup of $K^\times$, containing all elements $\xi\in K^\times$ satisfying $v(\xi)=0$ for all $v\notin P.$ Since $K^\times$ is discrete in $I_K$, $E(P)$ is a discrete subgroup of $\Omega(P)$ and, with the same argument, $E(P)$ is discrete in $\Omega_1(P):=\Omega(P)\cap I_K^1.$

An alternative definition is $E(P)=K(P)^\times$, where $K(P)$ is a subring of $K$ defined by

$$K(P):=
K\cap
\left(
\prod_{v\in P}K_v
\times
\prod_{v\notin P}O_v
\right).$$

As a consequence, $K(P)$ contains all elements $\xi\in K$ which fulfil $v(\xi)\geq 0$ for all $v\notin P.$

Lemma. Let $0<c\leq C<\infty.$ The following set is finite:

$$\left\{
\eta\in E(P):
\left.
\begin{cases}
|\eta_v|_v=1 & \forall v\notin P,\\
c\leq |\eta_v|_v\leq C & \forall v\in P.
\end{cases}
\right\}
\right\}.$$

Proof. Define

$$W:=
\left\{
(\alpha_v)_v:
\left.
\begin{cases}
|\alpha_v|_v=1 & \forall v\notin P,\\
c\leq |\alpha_v|_v\leq C & \forall v\in P.
\end{cases}
\right\}
\right\}.$$

$W$ is compact and the set described above is the intersection of $W$ with the discrete subgroup $K^\times$ in $I_K$ and therefore finite.

Lemma. Let $E$ be set of all $\xi\in K$ such that $|\xi|_v=1$ for all $v.$ Then $E=\mu(K)$, the group of all roots of unity of $K.$ In particular it is finite and cyclic.

Proof. All roots of unity of $K$ have absolute value $1$, so $\mu(K)\subset E.$ For the converse, note that the preceding lemma with $c=C=1$ and any $P$ implies $E$ is finite. Moreover $E\subset E(P)$ for each finite set of places $P\supset P_\infty.$ Finally, suppose there exists $\xi\in E$ which is not a root of unity of $K.$ Then $\xi^n\neq 1$ for all $n\in\mathbb N$, contradicting the finiteness of $E.$

Unit Theorem. $E(P)$ is the direct product of $E$ and a group isomorphic to $\mathbb Z^s$, where $s=0$ if $P=\emptyset$ and $s=|P|-1$ if $P\neq\emptyset.$

Dirichlet's Unit Theorem. Let $K$ be a number field. Then

$$O^\times\cong \mu(K)\times \mathbb Z^{r+s-1},$$

where $\mu(K)$ is the finite cyclic group of all roots of unity of $K$, $r$ is the number of real embeddings of $K$, and $s$ is the number of conjugate pairs of complex embeddings of $K.$ It stands that $[K:\mathbb Q]=r+2s.$

Remark. The Unit Theorem generalises Dirichlet's Unit Theorem. To see this, let $K$ be a number field. It is already known that $E=\mu(K)$, set $P=P_\infty$ and note $|P_\infty|=r+s.$ Then there is

$$\begin{align}
E\times \mathbb Z^{r+s-1}
=
E(P_\infty)
&=
K^\times\cap
\left(
\prod_{v|\infty}K_v^\times
\times
\prod_{v<\infty}O_v^\times
\right)\\
&\cong
K^\times\cap
\left(
\prod_{v<\infty}O_v^\times
\right)\\
&\cong
O^\times.
\end{align}$$

=== Duality for adelic vector spaces ===
The self-duality of the adele ring extends to adelic vector spaces.

Theorem (algebraic and continuous duals of the adele ring). Let $\chi$ be a non-trivial character of $\mathbb A_K$, which is trivial on $K.$ Let $E$ be a finite-dimensional vector space over $K.$ Let $E^\star$ and $\mathbb A_E^\star$ be the algebraic duals of $E$ and $\mathbb A_E.$ Denote the topological dual of $\mathbb A_E$ by $\mathbb A_E'$ and use $\langle\cdot,\cdot\rangle$ and $[\cdot,\cdot]$ to indicate the natural bilinear pairings on $\mathbb A_E\times\mathbb A_E'$ and $\mathbb A_E\times\mathbb A_E^\star.$ Then the formula

$$\langle e,e'\rangle=\chi([e,e^\star])$$

for all $e\in\mathbb A_E$ determines an isomorphism $e^\star\mapsto e'$ of $\mathbb A_E^\star$ onto $\mathbb A_E'$, where $e'\in\mathbb A_E'$ and $e^\star\in\mathbb A_E^\star.$ Moreover, if $e^\star\in\mathbb A_E^\star$ fulfils $\chi([e,e^\star])=1$ for all $e\in E$, then $e^\star\in E^\star.$
