= Restricted product =

Construction for topological groups

In mathematics, the restricted product is a construction in the theory of topological groups.

Let $I$ be an index set; $S$ a finite subset of $I$. If $G_i$ is a locally compact group for each $i \in I$, and $K_i \subset G_i$ is an open compact subgroup for each $i \in I \setminus S$, then the restricted product

$$\prod_i\nolimits' G_i\,$$

is the subset of the product of the $G_i$'s consisting of all elements $(g_i)_{i \in I}$ such that $g_i \in K_i$ for all but finitely many $i \in I \setminus S$.

This group is given the topology whose basis of open sets are those of the form

$$\prod_i A_i\,,$$

where $A_i$ is open in $G_i$ and $A_i = K_i$ for all but finitely many $i$.

One can easily prove that the restricted product is itself a locally compact group. The best known example of this construction is that of the adele ring and idele group of a global field.

== See also ==
- Direct sum
