= Tate's thesis =

Mathematic theory

In number theory, Tate's thesis is the 1950 PhD thesis of John Tate completed under the supervision of Emil Artin at Princeton University. In it, Tate used a translation invariant integration on the locally compact group of ideles to lift the zeta function twisted by a Hecke character, i.e. a Hecke L-function, of a number field to a zeta integral and study its properties. Using harmonic analysis, more precisely the Poisson summation formula, he proved the functional equation and meromorphic continuation of the zeta integral and the Hecke L-function. He also located the poles of the twisted zeta function.

Tate's work can be viewed as an elegant and powerful reformulation of a work of Erich Hecke on the proof of the functional equation of the Hecke L-function. Hecke had used a generalized theta series associated to an algebraic number field and a lattice in its ring of integers.

The thesis was published as a book chapter in 1967.

== Iwasawa–Tate theory ==
Kenkichi Iwasawa independently discovered essentially the same method (without an analog of the local theory in Tate's thesis) during the Second World War and announced it in his 1950 International Congress of Mathematicians paper and his letter to Jean Dieudonné written in 1952. Hence this theory is often called Iwasawa–Tate theory. Iwasawa, in his letter to Dieudonné, derived on several pages not only the meromorphic continuation and functional equation of the L-function, but also proved finiteness of the class number and Dirichlet's theorem on units as immediate byproducts of the main computation. The theory in positive characteristic was developed one decade earlier by Ernst Witt, Wilfried Schmid, and Oswald Teichmüller.

Iwasawa–Tate theory uses several structures which come from class field theory; however, it does not use any deep result of class field theory.

== Generalisations ==
In 1972, Roger Godement and Hervé Jacquet extended Iwasawa–Tate theory to the general linear group GL(n, k) over an algebraic number field k, and to automorphic representations of its adelic group, which formed the foundations of the Langlands correspondence. Tate's thesis can thus be viewed as the GL(1) case of the work by Godement–Jacquet.

== See also ==
- Basic Number Theory
