= Automorphic form =

Type of generalization of periodic functions in Euclidean space

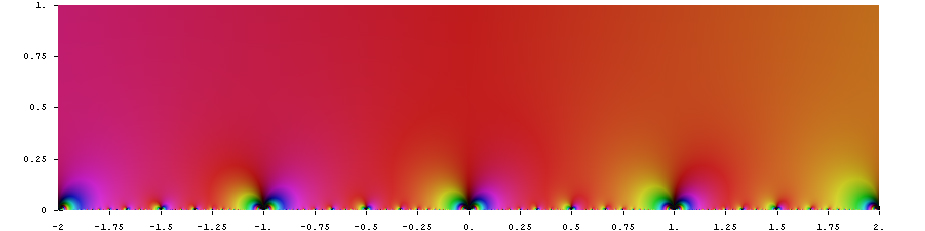
The Dedekind eta-function is an automorphic form in the complex plane.

In harmonic analysis and number theory, an automorphic form is a well-behaved function from a topological group $G$ to the complex numbers (or complex vector space) which is invariant under the action of a discrete subgroup $\Gamma < G$ of the topological group. Automorphic forms are a generalization of the idea of periodic functions in Euclidean space to general topological groups.

Modular forms are holomorphic automorphic forms defined over the groups SL(2, R) or PSL(2, R), with the discrete subgroup being the modular group or one of its congruence subgroups; in this sense the theory of automorphic forms is an extension of the theory of modular forms. More generally, one can use the adelic approach as a way of dealing with the whole family of congruence subgroups at once. From this point of view, an automorphic form over the group $G(\mathbb{A}_F)$, for an algebraic group $G$ and an algebraic number field $F$, is a complex-valued function on $G(\mathbb{A}_F)$ that is left invariant under $G(F)$ and satisfies certain smoothness and growth conditions.

Henri Poincaré first discovered automorphic forms as generalizations of trigonometric and elliptic functions. Through the Langlands conjectures, automorphic forms play an important role in modern number theory.

== Definition ==
In mathematics, the notion of factor of automorphy arises for a group acting on a complex-analytic manifold. Suppose a group $G$ acts on a complex-analytic manifold $X$. Then, $G$ also acts on the space of holomorphic functions from $X$ to the complex numbers. A function $f$ is termed an automorphic form if the following holds:

$$f(g\cdot x) = j_g(x)f(x)$$

where $j_g(x)$ is an everywhere nonzero holomorphic function. Equivalently, an automorphic form is a function whose divisor is invariant under the action of $G$.

The factor of automorphy for the automorphic form $f$ is the function $j$. An automorphic function is an automorphic form for which $j$ is the identity.

An automorphic form is a function F on G (with values in some fixed finite-dimensional vector space V, in the vector-valued case), subject to three kinds of conditions:

1. to transform under translation by elements $\gamma \in \Gamma$ according to the given factor of automorphy j;
2. to be an eigenfunction of certain Casimir operators on G; and
3. to satisfy a "moderate growth" asymptotic condition a height function.

It is the first of these that makes F automorphic, that is, satisfy a functional equation relating F(g) with F(γg) for $\gamma \in \Gamma$. In the vector-valued case the specification can involve a finite-dimensional group representation ρ acting on the components to 'twist' them. The Casimir operator condition says that some Laplacians have F as eigenfunction; this ensures that F has excellent analytic properties, but whether it is actually a complex-analytic function depends on the particular case. The third condition is to handle the case where G/Γ is not compact but has cusps.

The formulation requires the general notion of factor of automorphy j for Γ, which is a type of 1-cocycle in the language of group cohomology. The values of j may be complex numbers, or in fact complex square matrices, corresponding to the possibility of vector-valued automorphic forms. The cocycle condition imposed on the factor of automorphy is something that can be routinely checked, when j is derived from a Jacobian matrix, by means of the chain rule.

A more straightforward but technically advanced definition using class field theory, constructs automorphic forms and their correspondent functions as embeddings of Galois groups to their underlying global field extensions. In this formulation, automorphic forms are certain finite invariants, mapping from the idele class group under the Artin reciprocity law. Herein, the analytical structure of its L-function allows for generalizations with various algebro-geometric properties; and the resultant Langlands program. To oversimplify, automorphic forms in this general perspective, are analytic functionals quantifying the invariance of number fields in an abstract sense, therefore indicating the 'primitivity' of their fundamental structure. It is a mathematical tool for analyzing the invariant constructs of many numerical structure.

Examples of automorphic forms in an explicit unabstracted state are difficult to obtain, though some have directly analytical properties:

- The Eisenstein series (which is a prototypical modular form) over certain field extensions as Abelian groups.

- Specific generalizations of Dirichlet L-functions as class field-theoretic objects.

- Generally any harmonic analytic object as a functor over Galois groups which is invariant on its ideal class group (or idele).

As a general principle, automorphic forms can be thought of as analytic functions on abstract structures, which are invariant with respect to a generalized analogue of their prime ideal (or an abstracted irreducible fundamental representation). As mentioned, automorphic functions can be seen as generalizations of modular forms (as therefore elliptic curves), constructed by some zeta function analogue on an automorphic structure. In the simplest sense, automorphic forms are modular forms defined on general Lie groups; because of their symmetry properties. Therefore, in simpler terms, a general function which analyzes the invariance of a structure with respect to its prime 'morphology'.

== History ==
Before this very general setting was proposed (around 1960), there had already been substantial developments of automorphic forms other than modular forms. The case of Γ a Fuchsian group had already received attention before 1900 (see below). The Hilbert modular forms (also called Hilbert-Blumenthal forms) were proposed not long after that, though a full theory was long in coming. The Siegel modular forms, for which G is a symplectic group, arose naturally from considering moduli spaces and theta functions. The post-war interest in several complex variables made it natural to pursue the idea of automorphic form in the cases where the forms are indeed complex-analytic. Much work was done, in particular by Ilya Piatetski-Shapiro, in the years around 1960, in creating such a theory. The theory of the Selberg trace formula, as applied by others, showed the considerable depth of the theory. Robert Langlands showed how (in generality, many particular cases being known) the Riemann–Roch theorem could be applied to the calculation of dimensions of automorphic forms; this is a kind of post hoc check on the validity of the notion. He also produced the general theory of Eisenstein series, which corresponds to what in spectral theory terms would be the 'continuous spectrum' for this problem, leaving the cusp form or discrete part to investigate. From the point of view of number theory, the cusp forms had been recognised, since Srinivasa Ramanujan, as the heart of the matter.

== Automorphic representations ==
The subsequent notion of an "automorphic representation" has proved of technical value when dealing with G an algebraic group, treated as an adelic algebraic group. It does not completely include the automorphic form idea introduced above, in that the adelic approach is a way of dealing with the whole family of congruence subgroups at once. Inside an L^{2} space for a quotient of the adelic form of G, an automorphic representation is a representation that is an infinite tensor product of representations of p-adic groups, with specific enveloping algebra representations for the infinite prime(s). One way to express the shift in emphasis is that the Hecke operators are here in effect put on the same level as the Casimir operators; which is natural from the point of view of functional analysis, though not so obviously for the number theory. It is this concept that is basic to the formulation of the Langlands philosophy.

== Poincaré on discovery and his work on automorphic functions ==
One of Poincaré's first discoveries in mathematics, dating to the 1880s, was automorphic forms. He named them Fuchsian functions, after the mathematician Lazarus Fuchs, because Fuchs was known for being a good teacher and had researched on differential equations and the theory of functions. Poincaré actually developed the concept of these functions as part of his doctoral thesis. Under Poincaré's definition, an automorphic function is one which is analytic in its domain and is invariant under a discrete infinite group of linear fractional transformations. Automorphic functions then generalize both trigonometric and elliptic functions.

Poincaré explains how he discovered Fuchsian functions:

For fifteen days I strove to prove that there could not be any functions like those I have since called Fuchsian functions. I was then very ignorant; every day I seated myself at my work table, stayed an hour or two, tried a great number of combinations and reached no results. One evening, contrary to my custom, I drank black coffee and could not sleep. Ideas rose in crowds; I felt them collide until pairs interlocked, so to speak, making a stable combination. By the next morning I had established the existence of a class of Fuchsian functions, those which come from the hypergeometric series; I had only to write out the results, which took but a few hours.

== See also ==
- Automorphic factor
- Automorphic function
- Maass cusp form
- Automorphic Forms on GL(2), a book by H. Jacquet and Robert Langlands
- Jacobi form
