= Modulus (algebraic number theory) =

In mathematics, in the field of algebraic number theory, a modulus (plural moduli) (or cycle, or extended ideal) is a formal product of places of a global field (i.e. an algebraic number field or a global function field). It is used to encode ramification data for abelian extensions of a global field.

== Definition ==
Let K be a global field with ring of integers R. A modulus is a formal product

$$\mathbf{m} = \prod_{\mathbf{p}} \mathbf{p}^{\nu(\mathbf{p})},\,\,\nu(\mathbf{p})\geq0$$

where p runs over all places of K, finite or infinite, the exponents ν(p) are zero except for finitely many p. If K is a number field, ν(p) = 0 or 1 for real places and ν(p) = 0 for complex places. If K is a function field, ν(p) = 0 for all infinite places.

In the function field case, a modulus is the same thing as an effective divisor, and in the number field case, a modulus can be considered as special form of Arakelov divisor.

The notion of congruence can be extended to the setting of moduli. If a and b are elements of K^{×}, the definition of a ≡^{∗}b (mod p^{ν}) depends on what type of prime p is:

- if it is finite, then

$$a\equiv^\ast\!b\,(\mathrm{mod}\,\mathbf{p}^\nu)\Leftrightarrow \mathrm{ord}_\mathbf{p}\left(\frac{a}{b}-1\right)\geq\nu$$

where ord_{p} is the normalized valuation associated to p;

- if it is a real place (of a number field) and ν = 1, then

$$a\equiv^\ast\!b\,(\mathrm{mod}\,\mathbf{p})\Leftrightarrow \frac{a}{b}>0$$

under the real embedding associated to p.

- if it is any other infinite place, there is no condition.

Then, given a modulus m, a ≡^{∗}b (mod m) if a ≡^{∗}b (mod p^{ν(p)}) for all p such that ν(p) > 0.

== Ray class group ==
The ray modulo m is

$$K_{\mathbf{m},1}=\left\{ a\in K^\times : a\equiv^\ast\!1\,(\mathrm{mod}\,\mathbf{m})\right\}.$$

A modulus m can be split into two parts, m_{f} and m_{∞}, the product over the finite and infinite places, respectively. Let I^{m} to be one of the following:

- if K is a number field, the subgroup of the group of fractional ideals generated by ideals coprime to m_{f};
- if K is a function field of an algebraic curve over k, the group of divisors, rational over k, with support away from m.

In both case, there is a group homomorphism i : K_{m,1} → I^{m} obtained by sending a to the principal ideal (resp. divisor) (a).

The ray class group modulo m is the quotient C_{m} = I^{m} / i(K_{m,1}). A coset of i(K_{m,1}) is called a ray class modulo m.

Erich Hecke's original definition of Hecke characters may be interpreted in terms of characters of the ray class group with respect to some modulus m.

=== Properties ===
When K is a number field, the following properties hold.

- When m = 1, the ray class group is just the ideal class group.
- The ray class group is finite. Its order is the ray class number.
- The ray class number is divisible by the class number of K.
