= Adelic algebraic group =

Semitopological group in abstract algebra

In number theory and arithmetic geometry, the adelic points of an algebraic group $G$ over a global field $K$ form a topological group denoted $G(\mathbb A_K)$, where $\mathbb A_K$ is the adele ring of $K$. For a linear algebraic group, $G(\mathbb A_K)$ may be described as the restricted product of the local groups $G(K_v)$ over all places $v$ of $K$, with respect to compact open subgroups $G(\mathcal O_v)$ at almost all non-archimedean places.

Adelic groups provide the natural setting for automorphic forms and automorphic representations. Their basic quotients, such as $G(K)\backslash G(\mathbb A_K)$, encode arithmetic information from all completions of $K$ at once. Important examples include the idele group $\mathbb A_K^\times=\mathbb G_m(\mathbb A_K)$, adelic general linear groups $\operatorname{GL}_n(\mathbb A_K)$, adelic tori, and adelic points of reductive groups. Tamagawa measures and Tamagawa numbers are defined using Haar measures on such groups.

== History of the terminology ==
Historically the idèles (/ɪˈdɛlz/) were introduced by Chevalley (1936) under the name "élément idéal", which is "ideal element" in French, which Chevalley (1940) then abbreviated to "idèle" following a suggestion of Hasse. (In these papers he also gave the ideles a non-Hausdorff topology.) This was to formulate class field theory for infinite extensions in terms of topological groups. Weil (1938) defined (but did not name) the ring of adeles in the function field case and pointed out that Chevalley's group of Idealelemente was the group of invertible elements of this ring. Tate (1950) defined the ring of adeles as a restricted direct product, though he called its elements "valuation vectors" rather than adeles.

Chevalley (1951) defined the ring of adeles in the function field case, under the name "repartitions"; the contemporary term adèle stands for 'additive idèles', and can also be a French woman's name. The term adèle was in use shortly afterwards (Jaffard 1953) and may have been introduced by André Weil. The general construction of adelic algebraic groups by Ono (1957) followed the algebraic group theory founded by Armand Borel and Harish-Chandra.

== Definition ==
Let $K$ be a global field, and let $\mathbb A_K$ be its adele ring. If $G$ is an algebraic group over $K$, the notation $G(\mathbb A_K)$ denotes the group of adelic points of $G$. Informally, an element of $G(\mathbb A_K)$ is a compatible collection of local points of $G$, one over each completion $K_v$ of $K$.

For a linear algebraic group, the adelic group can be described as a restricted product
$$G(\mathbb A_K)=\prod_v' G(K_v),$$
where $v$ runs over the places of $K$. At almost all non-archimedean places $v$, the restricted product is taken with respect to the compact open subgroup $G(\mathcal O_v)$, where $\mathcal O_v$ is the valuation ring of $K_v$, after choosing an integral model of $G$ outside a finite set of places. Thus an element of $G(\mathbb A_K)$ is a tuple
$$(g_v)_v\in \prod_v G(K_v)$$
such that $g_v\in G(\mathcal O_v)$ for all but finitely many non-archimedean places $v$.

The restricted product topology makes $G(\mathbb A_K)$ a locally compact topological group in the usual linear algebraic cases. For example, if $G=\operatorname{GL}_n$, then
$$\operatorname{GL}_n(\mathbb A_K)
=
\prod_v' \operatorname{GL}_n(K_v),$$
with respect to the compact open subgroups $\operatorname{GL}_n(\mathcal O_v)$ at almost all non-archimedean places.

The rational points $G(K)$ embed diagonally in $G(\mathbb A_K)$. For linear algebraic groups, this diagonal image is discrete under the adelic topology. The resulting quotient
$$G(K)\backslash G(\mathbb A_K)$$
is one of the basic spaces on which automorphic forms and automorphic representations are defined.

The simplest examples are the additive and multiplicative groups. For the additive group $\mathbb G_a$,
$$\mathbb G_a(\mathbb A_K)=\mathbb A_K.$$
For the multiplicative group $\mathbb G_m$,
$$\mathbb G_m(\mathbb A_K)=\mathbb A_K^\times,$$
the idele group of $K$. The topology on $\mathbb A_K^\times$ is the restricted product topology with respect to $\mathcal O_v^\times$ at almost all non-archimedean places; equivalently, it is the topology induced by the embedding
$$x\longmapsto (x,x^{-1})$$
of $\mathbb A_K^\times$ into $\mathbb A_K\times \mathbb A_K$. It is generally finer than the subspace topology inherited from $\mathbb A_K$.

== Tamagawa measures and Tamagawa numbers ==
Let $G$ be a connected linear algebraic group over a global field $K$, and let $\mathbb A_K$ be the adele ring of $K$. A Tamagawa measure is a canonically normalized Haar measure on the adelic group $G(\mathbb A_K)$, constructed from algebraic differential forms on $G$.

Suppose first that $G$ is smooth of dimension $d$, and let $\omega$ be a nonzero left-invariant rational differential form of top degree on $G$, defined over $K$. Here "rational" means that $\omega$ is a rational section of the canonical sheaf $\Omega^d_{G/K}$, or equivalently a top-degree differential form defined at the generic point of $G$, with coefficients in the function field $K(G)$. For each place $v$ of $K$, the form $\omega$ defines a local Haar measure $|\omega|_v$ on the locally compact group $G(K_v)$. With the usual convergence normalizations at almost all places, these local measures define a measure on the restricted product $G(\mathbb A_K)$.

The construction is independent of multiplying $\omega$ by an element of $K^\times$. Indeed, if $\omega$ is replaced by $a\omega$, with $a\in K^\times$, then the local measure at $v$ is multiplied by $|a|_v$. The product formula for valuations,
$$\prod_v |a|_v=1,$$
implies that the resulting adelic measure is unchanged. This observation was one of the basic motivations for defining Tamagawa measures adelically.

When the quotient has finite measure, the Tamagawa number of $G$ is defined as
$$\tau(G)=\operatorname{vol}\bigl(G(K)\backslash G(\mathbb A_K)\bigr),$$
where the volume is taken with respect to the Tamagawa measure. Some authors use the opposite quotient notation $G(\mathbb A_K)/G(K)$; the two notations refer to the same quotient space after choosing left or right conventions, but $G(K)\backslash G(\mathbb A_K)$ is standard in the theory of automorphic forms.

For many reductive groups, Tamagawa numbers encode arithmetic information. In the case of tori they are related to class groups and Galois cohomology, while for semisimple groups they are connected with the arithmetic of quadratic forms and the volume of arithmetic quotients. Weil conjectured that if $G$ is a simply connected semisimple algebraic group over a number field, then
$$\tau(G)=1.$$
This conjecture was proved over number fields by work culminating in Robert Kottwitz's proof, building on earlier work of Robert Langlands.
