= Ray class field =

In mathematics, specifically class field theory, a ray class field is an abelian extension of a global field associated with a ray class group of ideal classes or idele classes. Every finite abelian extension of a number field is contained in one of its ray class fields.

The term "ray class group" is a translation of the German term "Strahlklassengruppe". Here "Strahl" is German for ray, and often means the positive real line, which appears in the positivity conditions defining ray class groups. Hasse uses "Strahl" to mean a certain group of ideals defined using positivity conditions, and uses "Strahlklasse" to mean a coset of this group.

There are two slightly different notions of what a ray class field is, as authors differ in how the infinite primes are treated.

== History ==
Weber introduced ray class groups in 1897. Takagi proved the existence of the corresponding ray class fields in about 1920. Chevalley reformulated the definition of ray class groups in terms of ideles in 1933.

== Ray class fields using ideals ==
If $m$ is an ideal of the ring of integers of a number field $K$ and $S$ is a subset of the real places, then the ray class group of $m$ and $S$ is the quotient group

$$I^m/P^m$$

where $I^m$ is the group of fractional ideals co-prime to $m$, and the "ray" $P^m$ is the group of principal ideals generated by elements $a$ with $a\equiv 1$ mod $m$ that are positive at the places of $S$. When $S$ consists of all real places, so that $a$ is restricted to be totally positive, the group is called the narrow ray class group of $m$. Some authors use the term "ray class group" to mean "narrow ray class group".

A ray class field of $K$ is the abelian extension of $K$ associated to a ray class group by class field theory, and its Galois group is isomorphic to the corresponding ray class group. The proof of existence of a ray class field of a given ray class group is long and indirect and there is in general no known easy way to construct it (though explicit constructions are known in some special cases such as imaginary quadratic fields).

== Ray class fields using ideles ==
Chevalley redefined the ray class group of an ideal $m$ and a set $S$ of real places as the quotient of the idele class group by image of the group $\textstyle\prod U_p$ where $U_p$ is given by:

- The nonzero complex numbers for a complex place $p$
- The positive real numbers for a real place $p$ in $S$, and all nonzero real numbers for $p$ not in $S$
- The units of $K_p$ for a finite place $p$ not dividing $m$
- The units of $K_p$ congruent to 1 mod $p^n$ if $p^n$ is the maximal power of $p$ dividing $m$.

Some authors use a more general definition, where the group $U_p$ is allowed to be all nonzero real numbers for certain real places $p$.

The ray class groups defined using ideles are naturally isomorphic to those defined using ideals. They are sometimes easier to handle theoretically because they are all quotients of a single group, and thus easier to compare.

The ray class field of a ray class group is the (unique) abelian extension $L$ of $K$ such that the norm of the idele class group $C_L$ of $L$ is the image of $\textstyle\prod U_p$ in the idele class group of $K$.

== Examples ==
If $K$ is the field of rational numbers, $m$ is a nonzero rational integer, and $S$ comprises the archimedean place of $K$, then the ray class group of $(m)$ and $S$ is isomorphic to the group of units of $\Z/m\Z$, and the ray class field is the field generated by the $m$th roots of unity. The ray class field for $(m)$ and the empty set of places is its maximal totally real subfield—the field $\mathbb{Q}(\cos (2\pi/m))$.

The Hilbert class field is the ray class field corresponding to the unit ideal and the empty set of real places, so it is the smallest ray class field. The narrow Hilbert class field is the ray class field corresponding to the unit ideal and the set of all real places, so it is the smallest narrow ray class field.
