= Global field =

Mathematical concept

In mathematics, a global field is one of two types of fields (the other one is local fields) that are characterized using valuations, or absolute values. There are two kinds of global fields:

- Algebraic number field: A finite extension of $\mathbb{Q}$
- Global function field: The function field of an irreducible algebraic curve over a finite field, equivalently, a finite extension of $\mathbb{F}_q(T)$, the field of rational functions in one variable over the finite field with $q=p^n$ elements.

An axiomatic characterization of these fields via valuation theory was given by Emil Artin and George Whaples in the 1940s.

== Axiomatic definition ==
We say that a field $K$ is a global field when there exists a set $\mathfrak{M}$ of places (equivalence classes of absolute values on $K$) such that:

- For every nonzero element $\alpha\in K$, $\vert \alpha \vert_{\mathfrak{p}} = 1$ for all but finitely many $\mathfrak{p} \in \mathfrak{M}$, and $\prod_{\mathfrak{p} \in \mathfrak{M}}\vert \alpha \vert_{\mathfrak{p}}=1$
- At least one of places in $\mathfrak{M}$ is either discrete with finite residue field or archimedean.

== Formal definitions ==
Only two kind of fields satisfy the axiomatic definition:

An algebraic number field

An algebraic number field F is a finite (and hence algebraic) field extension of the field of rational numbers Q. Thus F is a field that contains Q and has finite dimension when considered as a vector space over Q.

The function field of an irreducible algebraic curve over a finite field

A function field of an algebraic variety is the set of all rational functions on that variety. On an irreducible algebraic curve (i.e. a one-dimensional variety V) over a finite field, we define a rational function on an open affine subset U as the ratio of two polynomials in the affine coordinate ring of U, and a rational function on all of V consists of such local data that agree on the intersections of open affine subsets. This technically defines the rational functions on V to be the field of fractions of the affine coordinate ring of any open affine subset, since all such subsets are dense.

== Analogies between the two classes of global fields ==
There are a number of formal similarities between the two kinds of global fields. A field of either type has the property that all of its completions are locally compact fields (see local fields). Every field of either type can be realized as the field of fractions of a Dedekind domain in which every non-zero ideal is of finite index. In each case, one has the product formula for non-zero elements x:

$$\prod_v |x|_v = 1,$$

where v varies over all valuations of the field.

The analogy between the two kinds of fields has been a strong motivating force in algebraic number theory. The idea of an analogy between number fields and Riemann surfaces goes back to Richard Dedekind and Heinrich M. Weber in the nineteenth century. The more strict analogy expressed by the 'global field' idea, in which a Riemann surface's aspect as algebraic curve is mapped to curves defined over a finite field, was built up during the 1930s, culminating in the Riemann hypothesis for curves over finite fields settled by André Weil in 1940. The terminology may be due to Weil, who wrote his Basic Number Theory (1967) in part to work out the parallelism.

It is usually easier to work in the function field case and then try to develop parallel techniques on the number field side. The development of Arakelov theory and its exploitation by Gerd Faltings in his proof of the Mordell conjecture is a dramatic example. The analogy was also influential in the development of Iwasawa theory and the Main Conjecture. The proof of the fundamental lemma in the Langlands program also made use of techniques that reduced the number field case to the function field case.

== Theorems ==
=== Hasse–Minkowski theorem ===
The Hasse–Minkowski theorem is a fundamental result in number theory that states that two quadratic forms over a global field are equivalent if and only if they are equivalent locally at all places, i.e. equivalent over every completion of the field.

=== Artin reciprocity law ===
Artin's reciprocity law implies a description of the abelianization of the absolute Galois group of a global field K that is based on the Hasse local–global principle. It can be described in terms of cohomology as follows:

Let L_{v}/K_{v} be a Galois extension of local fields with Galois group G. The local reciprocity law describes a canonical isomorphism

$$\theta_v: K_v^{\times}/N_{L_v/K_v}(L_v^{\times}) \to G^{\text{ab}},$$

called the local Artin symbol, the local reciprocity map or the norm residue symbol.

Let L/K be a Galois extension of global fields and C_{L} stand for the idèle class group of L. The maps θ_{v} for different places v of K can be assembled into a single global symbol map by multiplying the local components of an idèle class. One of the statements of the Artin reciprocity law is that this results in a canonical isomorphism.
