= List of number fields with class number one =

This is an incomplete list of number fields with class number 1.

It is believed that there are infinitely many such number fields, but this has not been proven.

== Definition ==
The class number of a number field is by definition the order of the ideal class group of its ring of integers.

Thus, a number field has class number 1 if and only if its ring of integers is a principal ideal domain (and thus a unique factorization domain). The fundamental theorem of arithmetic says that Q has class number 1.

== Quadratic number fields ==
These are of the form K = Q(√d), for a square-free integer d.

=== Real quadratic fields ===
K is called real quadratic if d > 0. K has class number 1 for the following values of d (sequence A003172 in the OEIS):

- 2*, 3, 5*, 6, 7, 11, 13*, 14, 17*, 19, 21, 22, 23, 29*, 31, 33, 37*, 38, 41*, 43, 46, 47, 53*, 57, 59, 61*, 62, 67, 69, 71, 73*, 77, 83, 86, 89*, 93, 94, 97*, ...

(complete until d = 100)

*: The narrow class number is also 1 (see related sequence A003655 in OEIS).

Despite what would appear to be the case for these small values, not all prime numbers that are congruent to 1 modulo 4 appear on this list, notably the fields Q(√d) for d = 229 and d = 257 both have class number greater than 1 (in fact equal to 3 in both cases). The density of such primes for which Q(√d) does have class number 1 is conjectured to be nonzero, and in fact close to 76%, however it is not even known whether there are infinitely many real quadratic fields with class number 1.

=== Imaginary quadratic fields ===
K has class number 1 exactly for the 9 following negative values of d:

- −1, −2, −3, −7, −11, −19, −43, −67, −163.

(By definition, these also all have narrow class number 1.)

== Cubic fields ==
=== Totally real cubic field ===
The first 60 totally real cubic fields (ordered by discriminant) have class number one. In other words, all cubic fields of discriminant between 0 and 1944 (inclusively) have class number one. The next totally real cubic field (of discriminant 1957) has class number two. The polynomials defining the totally real cubic fields that have discriminants less than 500 with class number one are:

- x^{3} − x^{2} − 2x + 1 (discriminant 49)
- x^{3} − 3x − 1 (discriminant 81)
- x^{3} − x^{2} − 3x + 1 (discriminant 148)
- x^{3} − x^{2} − 4x − 1 (discriminant 169)
- x^{3} − 4x − 1 (discriminant 229)
- x^{3} − x^{2} − 4x + 3 (discriminant 257)
- x^{3} − x^{2} − 4x + 2 (discriminant 316)
- x^{3} − x^{2} − 4x + 1 (discriminant 321)
- x^{3} − x^{2} − 6x + 7 (discriminant 361)
- x^{3} − x^{2} − 5x − 1 (discriminant 404)
- x^{3} − x^{2} − 5x + 4 (discriminant 469)
- x^{3} − 5x − 1 (discriminant 473)

=== Complex cubic field ===
All complex cubic fields with discriminant greater than −500 have class number one, except the fields with discriminants −283, −331 and −491 which have class number 2. The real root of the polynomial for −23 is the reciprocal of the plastic ratio (negated), while that for −31 is the reciprocal of the supergolden ratio. The polynomials defining the complex cubic fields that have class number one and discriminant greater than −500 are:

- x^{3} − x^{2} + 1 (discriminant −23)
- x^{3} + x − 1 (discriminant −31)
- x^{3} − x^{2} + x + 1 (discriminant −44)
- x^{3} + 2x − 1 (discriminant −59)
- x^{3} − 2x − 2 (discriminant −76)
- x^{3} − x^{2} + x − 2 (discriminant −83)
- x^{3} − x^{2} + 2x + 1 (discriminant −87)
- x^{3} − x − 2 (discriminant −104)
- x^{3} − x^{2} + 3x − 2 (discriminant −107)
- x^{3} − 2 (discriminant −108)
- x^{3} − x^{2} − 2 (discriminant −116)
- x^{3} + 3x − 1 (discriminant −135)
- x^{3} − x^{2} + x + 2 (discriminant −139)
- x^{3} + 2x − 2 (discriminant −140)
- x^{3} − x^{2} − 2x − 2 (discriminant −152)
- x^{3} − x^{2} − x + 3 (discriminant −172)
- x^{3} − x^{2} + 2x − 3 (discriminant −175)
- x^{3} − x^{2} + 4x − 1 (discriminant −199)
- x^{3} − x^{2} + 2x + 2 (discriminant −200)
- x^{3} − x^{2} + x − 3 (discriminant −204)
- x^{3} − 2x − 3 (discriminant −211)
- x^{3} − x^{2} + 4x − 2 (discriminant −212)
- x^{3} + 3x − 2 (discriminant −216)
- x^{3} − x^{2} + 3 (discriminant −231)
- x^{3} − x − 3 (discriminant −239)
- x^{3} − 3 (discriminant −243)
- x^{3} + x − 6 (discriminant −244)
- x^{3} + x − 3 (discriminant −247)
- x^{3} − x^{2} − 3 (discriminant −255)
- x^{3} − x^{2} − 3x + 5 (discriminant −268)
- x^{3} − x^{2} − 3x − 3 (discriminant −300)
- x^{3} − x^{2} + 3x + 2 (discriminant −307)
- x^{3} − 3x − 4 (discriminant −324)
- x^{3} − x^{2} − 2x − 3 (discriminant −327)
- x^{3} − x^{2} + 4x + 1 (discriminant −335)
- x^{3} − x^{2} − x + 4 (discriminant −339)
- x^{3} + 3x − 3 (discriminant −351)
- x^{3} − x^{2} + x + 7 (discriminant −356)
- x^{3} + 4x − 2 (discriminant −364)
- x^{3} − x^{2} + 2x + 3 (discriminant −367)
- x^{3} − x^{2} + x − 4 (discriminant −379)
- x^{3} − x^{2} + 5x − 2 (discriminant −411)
- x^{3} − 4x − 5 (discriminant −419)
- x^{3} − x^{2} + 8 (discriminant −424)
- x^{3} − x − 8 (discriminant −431)
- x^{3} + x − 4 (discriminant −436)
- x^{3} − x^{2} − 2x + 5 (discriminant −439)
- x^{3} + 2x − 8 (discriminant −440)
- x^{3} − x^{2} − 5x + 8 (discriminant −451)
- x^{3} + 3x − 8 (discriminant −459)
- x^{3} − x^{2} + 5x − 3 (discriminant −460)
- x^{3} − 5x − 6 (discriminant −472)
- x^{3} − x^{2} + 4x + 2 (discriminant −484)
- x^{3} − x^{2} + 3x + 3 (discriminant −492)
- x^{3} + 4x − 3 (discriminant −499)

== Cyclotomic fields ==
The following is a complete list of thirty n for which the field $\mathbb{Q}$(ζ_{n}) has class number 1:

- 1, 3, 4, 5, 7, 8, 9, 11, 12, 13, 15, 16, 17, 19, 20, 21, 24, 25, 27, 28, 32, 33, 35, 36, 40, 44, 45, 48, 60, 84.

(Note that values of n congruent to 2 modulo 4 are redundant since $\mathbb{Q}$(ζ_{2n}) = $\mathbb{Q}$(ζ_{n}) when n is odd.)

On the other hand, the maximal real subfields $\mathbb{Q}$(cos(2π/2^{n})) of the 2-power cyclotomic fields $\mathbb{Q}$(ζ_{2^{n}}) (where n is a positive integer) are known to have class number 1 for n≤8, and it is conjectured that they have class number 1 for all n. Weber showed that these fields have odd class number. In 2009, Fukuda and Komatsu showed that the class numbers of these fields have no prime factor less than 10^{7}, and later improved this bound to 10^{9}. These fields are the n-th layers of the cyclotomic $\mathbb{Z}$_{2}-extension of $\mathbb{Q}$. Also in 2009, Morisawa showed that the class numbers of the layers of the cyclotomic $\mathbb{Z}$_{3}-extension of $\mathbb{Q}$ have no prime factor less than 10^{4}. Coates has raised the question of whether, for all primes p, every layer of the cyclotomic $\mathbb{Z}$_{p}-extension of $\mathbb{Q}$ has class number 1.

== CM fields ==
Simultaneously generalizing the case of imaginary quadratic fields and cyclotomic fields is the case of a CM field K, i.e. a totally imaginary quadratic extension of a totally real field. In 1974, Harold Stark conjectured that there are finitely many CM fields of class number 1. He showed that there are finitely many of a fixed degree. Shortly thereafter, Andrew Odlyzko showed that there are only finitely many Galois CM fields of class number 1. In 2001, V. Kumar Murty showed that of all CM fields whose Galois closure has solvable Galois group, only finitely many have class number 1.

A complete list of the 172 abelian CM fields of class number 1 was determined in the early 1990s by Ken Yamamura and is available on pages 915–919 of his article on the subject. Combining this list with the work of Stéphane Louboutin and Ryotaro Okazaki provides a full list of quartic CM fields of class number 1.

== See also ==
- Class number problem
- Class number formula
- Brauer–Siegel theorem
