= Heegner =

- Kurt Heegner was a German mathematician
- Heegner points are special points on elliptic curves
- The Stark–Heegner theorem identifies the imaginary quadratic fields of class number 1.
- A Heegner number is a number n such that Q(√−n) is an imaginary quadratic field of class number 1.
