= Golden field =

Rational numbers with root 5 added

In mathematics, $\Q\bigl(\;\!\!\sqrt5\;\!\bigr)$, sometimes called the golden field, is a number system consisting of the set of all numbers $a + b\sqrt5$, where $a$ and $b$ are both rational numbers and $\sqrt5$ is the square root of 5, along with the basic arithmetical operations (addition, subtraction, multiplication, and division). This arithmetic shares certain structural properties with the arithmetic of $\Q$, the field of rational numbers, making $\Q\bigl(\;\!\!\sqrt5\;\!\bigr)$ also a type of field. More specifically, it is a real quadratic field, the extension field of $\Q$ generated by combining rational numbers and $\sqrt5$ using arithmetical operations. The name comes from the golden ratio $\varphi$, a positive number satisfying the equation $\textstyle \varphi^2 = \varphi + 1$, which is the fundamental unit of $\Q\bigl(\;\!\!\sqrt5\;\!\bigr)$.

Calculations in the golden field can be used to study the Fibonacci numbers and other topics related to the golden ratio, notably the geometry of the regular pentagon and higher-dimensional shapes with fivefold symmetry.

== Basic arithmetic ==
Elements of the golden field are those numbers which can be written in the form $a + b\sqrt5$ where $a$ and $b$ are uniquely determined rational numbers, or in the form $\bigl(a + b\sqrt5\;\!\bigr)\big/ c$ where $a$, $b$, and $c$ are integers, which can be uniquely reduced to lowest terms, and where $\sqrt5 = 2.236\ldots$ is the square root of 5. It is sometimes more convenient instead to use the form $a + b\varphi$ where $a$ and $b$ are rational or the form $(a + b\varphi)/c$ where $a$, $b$, and $c$ are integers, and where $\varphi = \tfrac12\bigl(1 + \sqrt5\;\!\bigr) = {}\!$$1.618\ldots$ is the golden ratio.

Converting between these alternative forms is straight-forward: $a + b\sqrt5 = (a - b) + (2b)\varphi$ or, in the other direction, $a + b\varphi = \bigl(a + \tfrac12 b\bigr) + \bigl(\tfrac12 b\bigr)\sqrt5$.

To add or subtract two numbers, simply add or subtract the components separately:
$$\begin{align}
\bigl(a_1 + b_1\sqrt5\;\!\bigr) + \bigl(a_2 + b_2\sqrt5\;\!\bigr) &= (a_1 + a_2) + (b_1 + b_2)\sqrt5, \\[3mu]
(a_1 + b_1\varphi) + (a_2 + b_2\varphi) &= (a_1 + a_2) + (b_1 + b_2)\varphi.
\end{align}$$

To multiply two numbers, distribute:
$$\begin{align}
\bigl(a_1 + b_1\sqrt5\;\!\bigr) \bigl(a_2 + b_2\sqrt5\;\!\bigr) &= (a_1a_2 + 5b_1b_2) + (a_1b_2 + b_1a_2)\sqrt5, \\[3mu]
(a_1 + b_1\varphi)(a_2 + b_2\varphi) &= (a_1a_2 + b_1b_2) + (a_1b_2 + b_1a_2 + b_1b_2)\varphi.
\end{align}$$

To find the reciprocal of a number $\alpha$, rationalize the denominator: $1/\alpha = {}$$\overline\alpha / \alpha \overline\alpha = {}$$\overline\alpha / \mathrm{N}(\alpha)$, where $\overline\alpha$ is the algebraic conjugate and $\mathrm N(\alpha)$ is the field norm, as defined below. Explicitly:
$$\begin{align}
\frac{1}{a + b\sqrt5} &= \frac{1}{a + b\sqrt5} \cdot \frac{a - b\sqrt5}{a - b\sqrt5} = \frac{a}{a^2 - 5b^2} - \frac{b}{a^2 - 5b^2}\sqrt5, \\[3mu]
\frac{1}{a + b\varphi} &= \frac{1}{a + b\varphi} \cdot \frac{a + b - b\varphi}{a + b - b\varphi} = \frac{a + b}{a^2 + ab - b^2 } - \frac{b}{a^2 + ab - b^2 }\varphi.
\end{align}$$

To divide two numbers, multiply the first by second's reciprocal:
$$\begin{align}
\frac{a_1 + b_1\sqrt5}{a_2 + b_2\sqrt5} &= \frac{a_1a_2 - 5b_1b_2}{a_2^2 - 5b_2^2} + \frac{-a_1b_2 + b_1a_2}{a_2^2 - 5b_2^2}\sqrt5, \\[6mu]
\frac{a_1 + b_1\varphi}{a_2 + b_2\varphi} &=  \frac{a_1a_2 + a_1b_2 - b_1b_2}{a_2^2 + a_2b_2 - b_2^2 } + \frac{-a_1b_2 + b_1a_2}{a_2^2 + a_2b_2 - b_2^2 }\varphi.
\end{align}$$

As in any field, addition and multiplication of numbers in $\Q\bigl(\;\!\!\sqrt5\;\!\bigr)$ is associative and commutative; $0$ is the additive identity and $1$ is the multiplicative identity; every number $\alpha$ has an additive inverse $-\alpha$ and a multiplicative inverse $1/\alpha$; and multiplication distributes over addition. Arithmetic between numbers in $\Q\bigl(\;\!\!\sqrt5\;\!\bigr)$ is consistent with their arithmetic as real numbers; that is, $\Q\bigl(\;\!\!\sqrt5\;\!\bigr)$ is a subfield of $\R$.

== Conjugation and norm ==
The numbers $\sqrt5$ and $-\sqrt5$ each solve the equation $\textstyle x^2 = 5$. Each number $\alpha = a + b\sqrt5$ in $\Q\bigl(\;\!\!\sqrt5\;\!\bigr)$ has an algebraic conjugate $\overline\alpha$ found by swapping these two square roots of 5, i.e., by changing the sign of $b$. The conjugate of $\varphi$ is $\overline\varphi = \tfrac12\bigl(1 - \sqrt5\;\!\bigr) = {}$$\textstyle -\varphi^{-1} = {}$$1 - \varphi$. A rational number is its own conjugate, $a = \overline a$. In general, the conjugate is:
$$\begin{align}
\overline{a + b\sqrt5} &= a - b\sqrt5, \\[3mu]
\overline{a + b\varphi} &= a + b\overline\varphi = (a + b) - b\varphi.
\end{align}$$
Conjugation in $\Q\bigl(\;\!\!\sqrt5\;\!\bigr)$ is an involution, $\overline{(\overline\alpha)} = \alpha$, and it preserves the structure of arithmetic: $\overline{\alpha_1 + \alpha_2} = \overline\alpha_1 +\overline\alpha_2$; $\overline{\alpha_1\alpha_2} = \overline\alpha_1 \overline\alpha_2$; and $\overline{\alpha_1 /\alpha_2} = \overline\alpha_1 /\, \overline\alpha_2$. Conjugation is the only ring homomorphism (function preserving the structure of addition and multiplication) from $\Q\bigl(\;\!\!\sqrt5\;\!\bigr)$ to itself, other than the identity function.

The field trace is the sum of a number and its conjugates (so-called because multiplication by an element in the field can be seen as a kind of linear transformation, the trace of whose matrix is the field trace). The trace of $\alpha$ in $\Q\bigl(\;\!\!\sqrt5\;\!\bigr)$ is $\mathrm{tr}(\alpha) = \alpha + \overline\alpha$:
$$\begin{align}
\mathrm{tr}\bigl(a + b\sqrt5\;\!\bigr) &= \bigl(a + b\sqrt5\;\!\bigr) + \bigl(a - b\sqrt5\;\!\bigr) = 2a, \\[3mu]
\mathrm{tr}(a + b\varphi) &= (a + b\varphi) + (a + b - b\varphi) = 2a + b.
\end{align}$$
This is always an (ordinary) rational number.

The field norm is a measure of a number's magnitude, the product of the number and its conjugates. The norm of $\alpha$ in $\Q\bigl(\;\!\!\sqrt5\;\!\bigr)$ is $\mathrm{N}(\alpha) = \alpha\overline\alpha$:
$$\begin{align}
\mathrm{N}\bigl(a + b\sqrt5\;\!\bigr) &= a^2 - 5b^2, \\[3mu]
\mathrm{N}(a + b\varphi) &= a^2 + ab - b^2.
\end{align}$$
This is also always a rational number.

The norm preserves the structure of multiplication, as expected for a concept of magnitude. The norm of a product is the product of norms, $\operatorname{N}(\alpha_1 \alpha_2) = \mathrm{N}(\alpha_1)\;\!\mathrm{N}(\alpha_2)\!$; and the norm of a quotient is the quotient of the norms, $\mathrm{N}(\alpha_1/\alpha_2) = \mathrm{N}(\alpha_1)\big/\;\!\mathrm{N}(\alpha_2)$. A number and its conjugate have the same norm, $\mathrm{N}(\alpha) = \mathrm{N}(\overline\alpha)$.

A number $\alpha$ in $\Q\bigl(\;\!\!\sqrt5\;\!\bigr)$ and its conjugate $\overline\alpha$ are the solutions of the quadratic equation
$$(x - \alpha)(x - \overline\alpha)
= x^2 - \mathrm{tr}(\alpha)x + \mathrm{N}(\alpha) = 0.$$

In Galois theory, the golden field can be considered more abstractly as the set of all numbers $a + bu$, where $a$ and $b$ are both rational, and all that is known of $u$ is that it satisfies the equation $\textstyle u^2 = 5$. There are two ways to embed this set in the real numbers: by mapping $u$ to the positive square root $\sqrt5$ or alternatively by mapping $u$ to the negative square root $-\sqrt5$. Conjugation exchanges these two embeddings. The Galois group of the golden field is thus the group with two elements, namely the identity and an element which is its own inverse.

== Golden integers ==
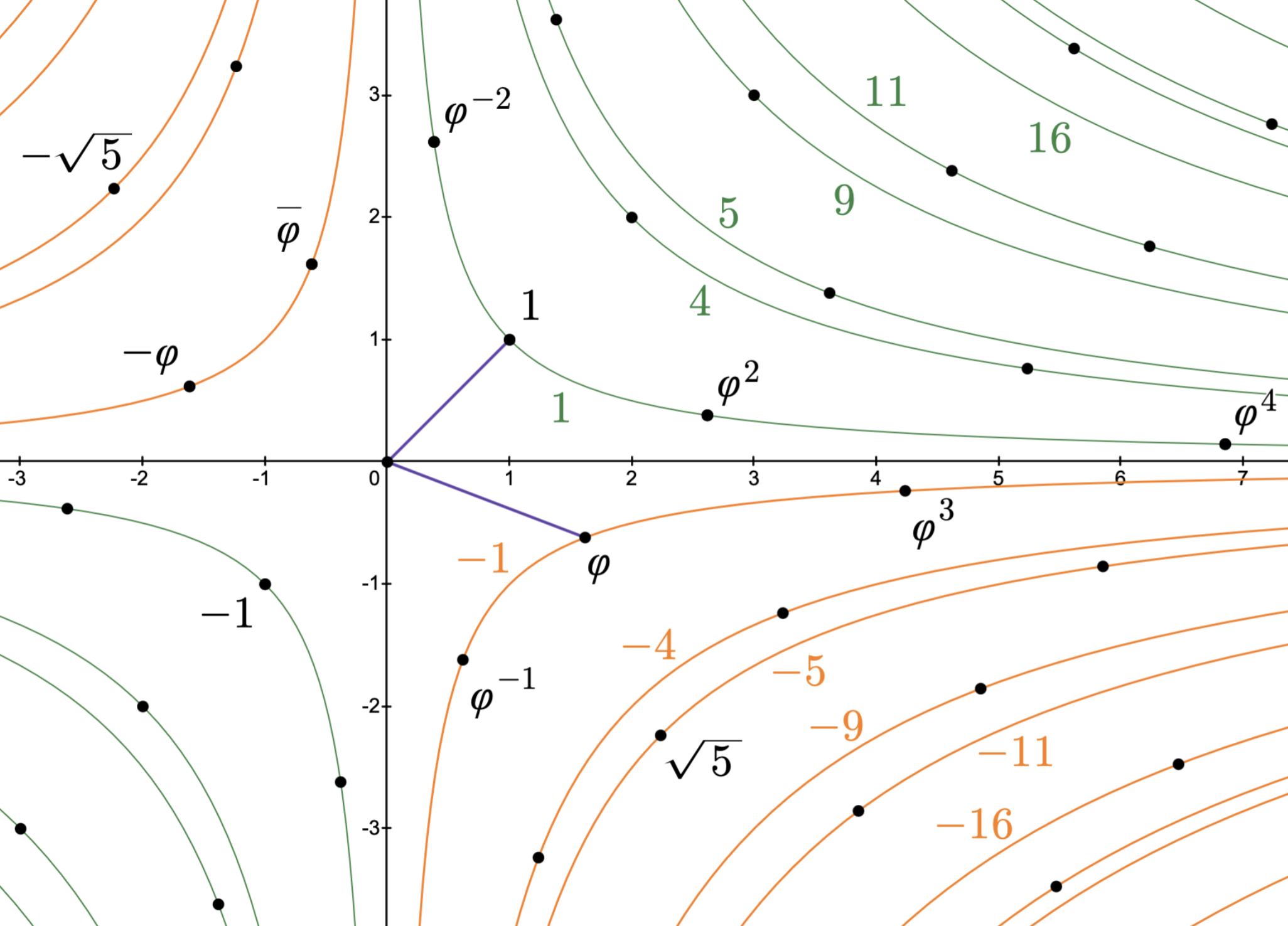
One convenient way to plot Z[φ] is as a lattice in the real coordinate plane. The so-called canonical embedding represents the number α by the point with coordinates (α, α̅). Numbers with the same norm lie on hyperbolas (orange and green lines).

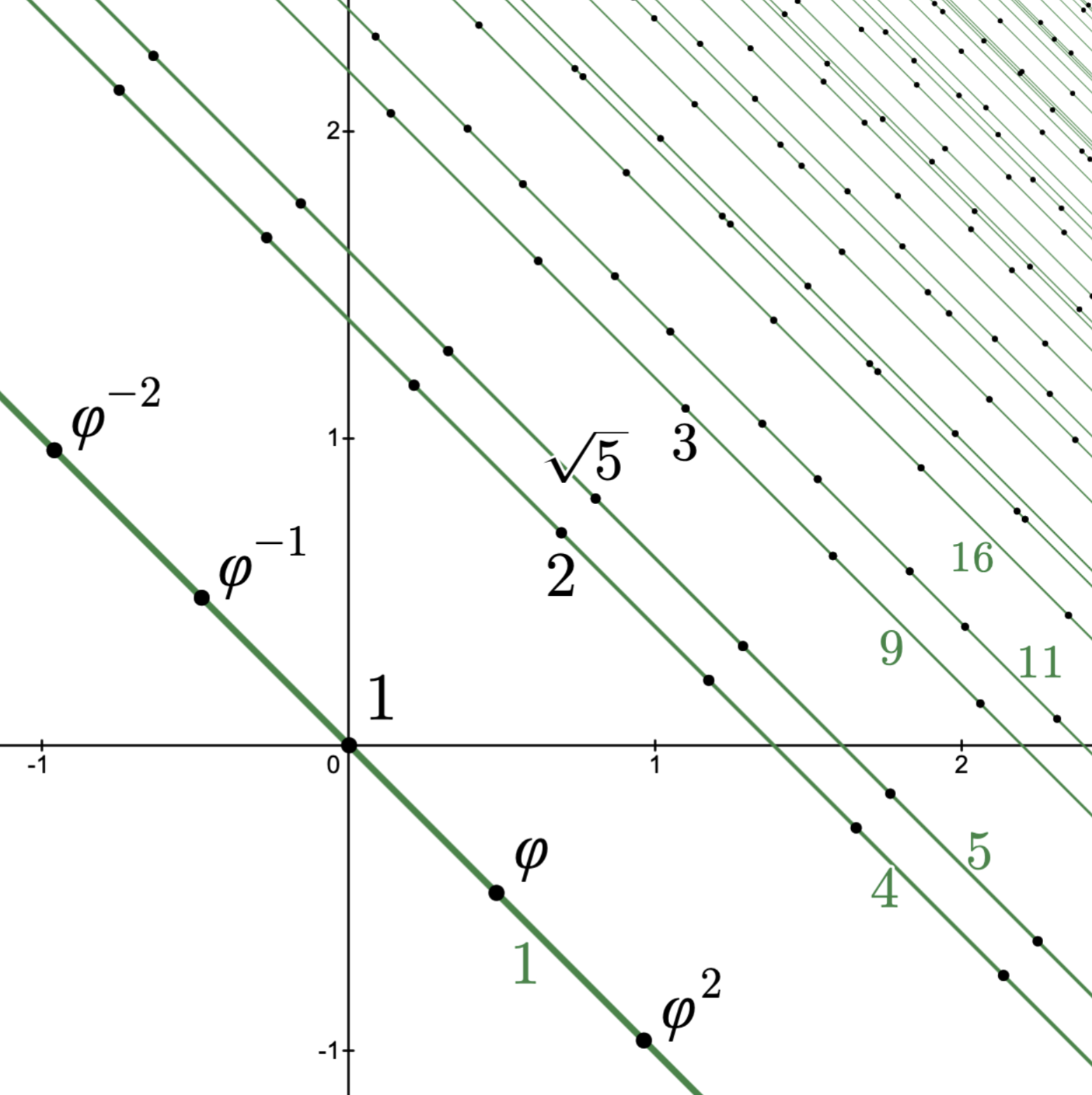
The logarithmic embedding into the plane represents the (non-zero) number α by the point with coordinates ( log |α|, log |α̅|) – See Log–log plot. Multiplication in the golden field corresponds to vector addition in the embedding. Numbers whose norm has the same absolute value lie on diagonal lines.

The ring of integers of the golden field, $\Z[\varphi]$, sometimes called the golden integers, is the set of all algebraic integers in the field, meaning those elements whose minimal polynomial over $\Q$ has integer coefficients. These are the set of numbers in $\Q\bigl(\;\!\!\sqrt5\;\!\bigr)$ whose norm and trace are integers. The numbers $1$ and $\varphi$ form an integral basis for the ring, meaning every number in the ring can be written in the form $a + b\varphi$ where $a$ and $b$ are ordinary integers. Alternately, elements of $\Z[\varphi]$ can be written in the form $\tfrac12a + \tfrac12b\sqrt5$, where $a$ and $b$ have the same parity. Like any ring, $\Z[\varphi]$ is closed under addition and multiplication. $\Q\bigl(\;\!\!\sqrt5\;\!\bigr)$ is the smallest field containing $\Z[\varphi]$, its field of fractions.

=== Norms ===
The set of all norms of golden integers includes every number $\textstyle a^2 + ab - b^2 ={}\!$$\mathrm{N}(a + b\varphi)$ for ordinary integers $a$ and $b$. These are precisely the ordinary integers whose ordinary prime factors which are congruent to $\pm 2$ modulo $5$ occur with even exponents (see § Primes and prime factorization below). The first several non-negative integer norms are:

$0$, $1$, $4$, $5$, $9$, $11$, $16$, $19$, $20$, $25$, $29$, . . . .

The golden integer $0 = 0 + 0\varphi$ is called zero, and is the only element of $\Z[\varphi]$ with norm $0$.

=== Divisibility ===
If $\alpha$ and $\beta$ are golden integers and there is some golden integer $\gamma$ such that $\alpha\gamma = \beta$, we say that $\alpha$ divides $\beta$, denoted $\alpha \mid \beta$. In many respects, divisibility works similarly as among the ordinary integers, but with some important differences, as will be described in the following subsections.

Because, like the integers, $\Z[\varphi]$ is an integral domain, the product of two non-zero elements is always non-zero. Thus $\Z[\varphi]$ has no nontrivial zero divisors, and $\alpha\beta = 0$ implies that either $\alpha = 0$ or $\beta = 0$.

=== Units ===
A unit is an algebraic integer which divides $1$, i.e. whose multiplicative inverse is also an algebraic integer, which happens when its norm is $\pm 1$. Among the ordinary integers, the units are the pair of numbers $\pm1$, but among the golden integers there are infinitely many units: all numbers of the form $a + b\varphi$ whose integer coefficients $a$ and $b$ solve the Diophantine equation $\textstyle a^2 + ab - b^2 = \pm1$. If a unit is instead written in the form $\tfrac12a + \tfrac12b\sqrt5$, its coefficients solve a related Diophantine equation, the generalized Pell's equation $\textstyle a^2 -5b^2 = \pm4$. The fundamental unit – the smallest unit greater than $1$ – is the golden ratio $\varphi = \tfrac12 + \tfrac12\sqrt5$ and the other units consist of its positive and negative powers, $\pm\varphi^n$, for any integer $n$. Some powers of $\varphi$ are:

| $\boldsymbol n$ | $\ldots$ | $-2$ | $-1$ | $0$ | $1$ | $2$ | $3$ | $4$ | $\ldots$ | $n$ |
| $\boldsymbol {\varphi^n}$ | $\ldots$ | $2-\varphi$ | $-1+\varphi$ | $1$ | $\varphi$ | $1+\varphi$ | $1+2\varphi$ | $2+3\varphi$ | $\ldots$ | $F_{n-1}+F_n\varphi$ |

In general $\textstyle \varphi^{n} = F_{n-1} + F_n\varphi$, where $F_n$ is the $n$th Fibonacci number. The units form the group $\Z[\varphi]^\times\!$ under multiplication, which can be decomposed as the direct product of a cyclic group of order 2 generated by $-1$ and an infinite cyclic group generated by $\varphi$.

=== Associates ===
Two golden integers $\alpha_1$ and $\alpha_2$ are associates if each divides the other, $\alpha_1 \mid \alpha_2$ and $\alpha_2 \mid \alpha_1$. Equivalently, their quotient in $\Q(\varphi)$ is a unit, $\alpha_2 = \pm\varphi^n\alpha_1$ for some integer $n$. Associateness is an equivalence relation. If $\alpha_1$ divides some golden integer $\beta$, then so does its associate $\alpha_2$: if $\alpha_1 \mid \beta$ then $\alpha_2 \mid \beta$.

Associates have the same norm, up to sign: $|\mathrm{N}(\alpha_1)| = |\mathrm{N}(\alpha_2)|$. However, not all elements whose norm has the same absolute value are associates; in particular, any golden-integer prime and its conjugate have the same norm, but are associates if and only if they are associated either with $\sqrt 5$ or with an ordinary prime.

More generally, two numbers in $\Q\bigl(\;\!\!\sqrt5\;\!\bigr)$ are associates if their quotient is a unit. The set of associates of any number in $\Q\bigl(\;\!\!\sqrt5\;\!\bigr)$ is the orbit of any of them under the multiplicative action of the group of units.

=== Primes and prime factorization ===
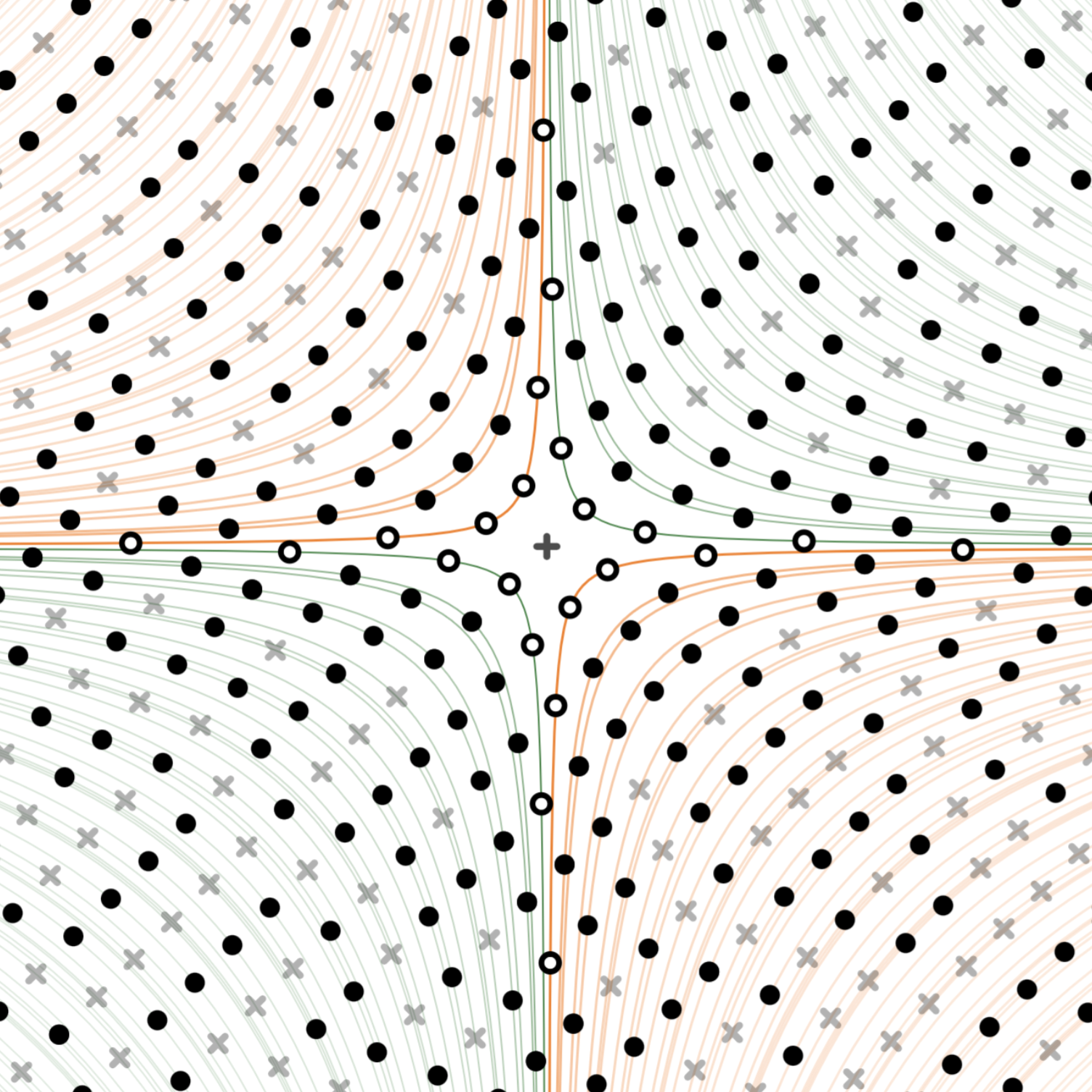
Golden integer units (hollow circles) and primes (filled circles), along with zero (+) and composite numbers (×)

A prime element of a ring, analogous to a prime number among the integers, is an element $\gamma$ such that whenever $\gamma \mid \alpha\beta$, then either $\gamma \mid \alpha$ or $\gamma \mid \beta$. In $\Z[\varphi]$ the primes are of three types: $\sqrt5 = -1 + 2\varphi$, integer primes of the form $p = 5n \pm 2$ where $n$ is an integer, and the factors of integer primes of the form $p = 5n \pm 1$ (a pair of conjugates). For example, $2$, $3$, and $7$ are primes, but $11 = (3 + \varphi)(4 - \varphi)$ is composite. Any of these is an associate of additional primes; for example $2\varphi$ is also prime, an associate of $2$.

The ring $\Z[\varphi]$ is a Euclidean domain with the absolute value of the norm as its Euclidean function, meaning a version of the Euclidean algorithm can be used to find the greatest common divisor of two numbers. This makes $\Q\bigl(\;\!\!\sqrt5\;\!\bigr)$ one of the 21 quadratic fields that are norm-Euclidean. A form of the fundamental theorem of arithmetic applies in $\Z[\varphi]$: every golden integer can be written as a product of prime elements multiplied by a unit, and this factorization is unique up to the order of the factors and the replacement of any prime factor by one of its associates (which changes the unit factor accordingly).

=== Ideals ===
An ideal of $\Z[\varphi]$ is any subset which "absorbs multiplication", containing every golden-integer multiple of each of its elements. If $\alpha$ is any golden integer, the set of all golden-integer multiples of $\alpha$, denoted $\alpha\Z[\varphi]$ or $(\alpha)$, is the ideal generated by $\alpha$. Every associated element generates the same ideal, but a non-associated element generates a different ideal: that is, $(\alpha) = (\beta)$ precisely when $\textstyle \alpha = \pm\beta\varphi^n$. Because $\Z[\varphi]$ is a principal ideal domain, each ideal of $\Z[\varphi]$ can be generated by a single element. The zero ideal $(0)$ is the single-element set $\{ 0\}$. The ideal $(1)$ is all of $\Z[\varphi]$.

Various operations can be defined among ideals. If $\mathfrak a$ and $\mathfrak b$ are ideals of $\Z[\varphi]$, then $\mathfrak{a} + \mathfrak{b}$ is the set of all sums of one element in $\mathfrak a$ plus one element in $\mathfrak b$, and $\mathfrak{a} \mathfrak{b}$ is the set of all sums of any number of terms, each of which is the product of one element in $\mathfrak a$ times one element in $\mathfrak b$.
$$\begin{align}
\! \mathfrak{a} + \mathfrak{b} &= \{\,\alpha + \beta \mid \alpha \in \mathfrak{a},\, \beta \in \mathfrak{b} \,\}, \\[3mu]
\! \mathfrak{a} \mathfrak{b} &= \bigl\{\, {\textstyle \sum_{i=1}^n \alpha_i\beta_i} \mathrel{\big|} n \in \N,\, a_i \in \mathfrak{a},\, b_i \in \mathfrak{b} \,\bigr\}.
\end{align}$$
The sum or product of two ideals is itself an ideal. Multiplication of ideals is distributive over addition.

More generally, a fractional ideal of $\Q\bigl(\;\!\!\sqrt5\;\!\bigr)$ is a subset of $\Q\bigl(\;\!\!\sqrt5\;\!\bigr)$ with the property that multiplication of each element by some golden integer, the "denominator", results in an ideal of $\Z[\varphi]$. If $\alpha$ is any number in $\Q\bigl(\;\!\!\sqrt5\;\!\bigr)$, the set of golden-integer multiples of $\alpha$, also denoted $\alpha\Z[\varphi]$ or $(\alpha)$, is the fractional ideal generated by $\alpha$. As with integral ideals of $\Z[\varphi]$, numbers in $\Q\bigl(\;\!\!\sqrt5\;\!\bigr)$ generate the same fractional ideal if and only if they are associated, and every fractional ideal can be generated by a single element. Multiplication of fractional ideals is consistent with multiplication of their generators. Let $\textstyle \Q\bigl(\sqrt5\;\!\bigr)\vphantom)^{\;\!\!\times}$ be the multiplicative group of the nonzero elements of $\Q\bigl(\;\!\!\sqrt5\;\!\bigr)$, and $U$ be the group of the units. The function that maps each element of $\Q\bigl(\sqrt5\;\!\bigr)\vphantom)^{\;\!\!\times}$ to the generated fractional ideal, $\alpha \mapsto (\alpha)$, induces a group isomorphism between $\Q\bigl(\sqrt5\;\!\bigr)\vphantom)^{\;\!\!\times}\! \big/ U$ and the group of fractional ideals.

=== Table of integers ===
In the table below, positive golden integers have been arranged into rows, with one representative chosen for each class of associates (here the representative is the positive element $\alpha$ in the class for which $\alpha + | \overline\alpha |$ is a minimum). The units $\pm\varphi^n$ (associates of $1$) and the number $\sqrt5 = -1 + 2\varphi$ and its associates $\pm\sqrt5\,\varphi^n$ appear often in applications.

| Rep. | Norm | Trace | Factorization | Positive associates |
|---|---|---|---|---|
| $\phantom-0$ | $\phantom-0$ | $\phantom-0$ | zero | |
| $\phantom-1$ | $\phantom-1$ | $\phantom-2$ | unit | $\ldots$, $-3 + 2\varphi$, $2 - \varphi$, $-1 + \varphi$; $\varphi$, $1 + \varphi$, $1 + 2\varphi$, $\ldots$ |
| $\phantom-2$ | $\phantom-4$ | $\phantom-4$ | prime | $\ldots$, $4 - 2\varphi$, $-2 + 2\varphi$; $2\varphi$, $2 + 2\varphi$, $\ldots$ |
| $-1 + 2\varphi$ | $-5$ | $\phantom-0$ | prime | $\ldots$, $-4 + 3\varphi$, $3 - \varphi$; $2 + \varphi$, $1 + 3\varphi$, $\ldots$ |
| $\phantom-3$ | $\phantom-9$ | $\phantom-6$ | prime | $\ldots$, $6 - 3\varphi$, $-3 + 3\varphi$; $3\varphi$, $3 + 3\varphi$, $\ldots$ |
| $-1 + 3\varphi$ | $-11$ | $\phantom-1$ | prime | $\ldots$, $-5 + 4\varphi$, $4-\varphi$; $3 + 2\varphi$, $2 - 5\varphi$, $\ldots$ |
| $-2 + 3\varphi$ | $-11$ | $-1$ | prime | $\ldots$, $-7 +5\varphi$, $5 -2\varphi$; $3+\varphi$, $1 +4\varphi$ $\ldots$ |
| $\phantom-4$ | $\phantom-16$ | $\phantom-8$ | $2^2$ | $\ldots$, $8 - 4\varphi$, $-4 + 4\varphi$; $4\varphi$, $4 + 4\varphi$, $\ldots$ |
| $-1 + 4\varphi$ | $-19$ | $\phantom-2$ | prime | $\ldots$, $-6+5\varphi$, $5 -\varphi$; $4 + 3\varphi$, $3 + 7\varphi$, $\ldots$ |
| $-3 + 4\varphi$ | $-19$ | $-2$ | prime | $\ldots$, $-10+7\varphi$, $7 -3\varphi$; $4 + \varphi$, $1 + 5\varphi$, $\ldots$ |
| $-2 + 4\varphi$ | $-20$ | $\phantom-0$ | $2(-1+2\varphi)$ | $\ldots$, $-8+6\varphi$, $6-2\varphi$; $4+2\varphi$, $2+6\varphi$, $\ldots$ |
| $\phantom-5$ | $\phantom-25$ | $\phantom-10$ | $(-1+2\varphi)^2$ | $\ldots$, $10-5\varphi$, $-5+5\varphi$; $5\varphi$, $5+5\varphi$, $\ldots$ |
| $\phantom-5+\varphi$ | $\phantom-29$ | $\phantom-11$ | prime | $\ldots$, $9-4\varphi$, $-4+5\varphi$; $1+6\varphi$, $6+7\varphi$, $\ldots$ |
| $\phantom-6-\varphi$ | $\phantom-29$ | $\phantom-11$ | prime | $\ldots$, $13-7\varphi$, $-7+6\varphi$; $-1+5\varphi$, $5+4\varphi$, $\ldots$ |
| $-2 + 5\varphi$ | $-31$ | $\phantom-1$ | prime | $\ldots$, $-9+7\varphi$, $7-2\varphi$; $5+3\varphi$, $3+8\varphi$, $\ldots$ |
| $-3 + 5\varphi$ | $-31$ | $-1$ | prime | $\ldots$, $-11+8\varphi$, $8-3\varphi$; $5+2\varphi$, $2+7\varphi$, $\ldots$ |
| $\phantom-6$ | $\phantom-36$ | $\phantom-12$ | $2\cdot3$ | $\ldots$, $12-6\varphi$, $-6+6\varphi$; $6\varphi$, $6+6\varphi$, $\ldots$ |
| $\phantom-6+\varphi$ | $\phantom-41$ | $\phantom-13$ | prime | $\ldots$, $11-5\varphi$, $-5+6\varphi$; $1+7\varphi$, $7+8\varphi$, $\ldots$ |
| $\phantom-7-\varphi$ | $\phantom-41$ | $\phantom-13$ | prime | $\ldots$, $15-8\varphi$, $-8+7\varphi$; $-1+6\varphi$, $6+5\varphi$, $\ldots$ |
| $-2+6\varphi$ | $-44$ | $\phantom-2$ | $2 (-1+3\varphi)$ | $\ldots$, $-10 + 8\varphi$, $8 - 2\varphi$; $6+4\varphi$, $4 + 10\varphi$, $\ldots$ |
| $-4+6\varphi$ | $-44$ | $-2$ | $2 (-2+3\varphi)$ | $\ldots$, $-14+10\varphi$, $10-4\varphi$; $6+2\varphi$, $2 + 8\varphi$, $\ldots$ |
| $-3+6\varphi$ | $-45$ | $0$ | $3 (-1+2\varphi)$ | $\ldots$, $-12+9\varphi$, $9-3\varphi$; $6+3\varphi$, $3 + 9\varphi$, $\ldots$ |
| $\phantom-7$ | $49$ | $14$ | prime | $\ldots$, $14 - 7\varphi$, $-7 + 7\varphi$; $7\varphi$, $7 + 7\varphi$, $\ldots$ |
| $\phantom-7+\varphi$ | $\phantom-55$ | $15$ | $(-1+2\varphi)(-1 + 3\varphi)$ | $\ldots$, $13-6\varphi$, $-6+7\varphi$; $1+8\varphi$, $8+9\varphi$, $\ldots$ |
| $\phantom-8-\varphi$ | $\phantom-55$ | $15$ | $(-1+2\varphi)(-2 + 3\varphi)$ | $\ldots$, $17-9\varphi$, $-9+8\varphi$; $-1+7\varphi$, $7+6\varphi$, $\ldots$ |
| $-2+7\varphi$ | $-59$ | $3$ | prime | $\ldots$, $-11+9\varphi$, $9-2\varphi$; $7+5\varphi$, $5+12\varphi$, $\ldots$ |
| $-5+7\varphi$ | $-59$ | $-3$ | prime | $\ldots$, $-17+12\varphi$, $12-5\varphi$; $7+2\varphi$, $2+9\varphi$, $\ldots$ |
$\quad\!\vdots$ Show/hide more rows

== Matrix representation ==
$\Q\bigl(\;\!\!\sqrt5\;\!\bigr)$ is a two-dimensional vector space over $\Q$, and multiplication by any element of $\Q\bigl(\;\!\!\sqrt5\;\!\bigr)$ is a linear transformation of that vector space. Given an ordered basis of $\Q\bigl(\;\!\!\sqrt5\;\!\bigr)$, each number in $\Q\bigl(\;\!\!\sqrt5\;\!\bigr)$ can be associated to the corresponding transformation matrix in that basis. This defines a field isomorphism (a structure-preserving bijective map) from $\Q\bigl(\;\!\!\sqrt5\;\!\bigr)$ to the space of $2 \times 2$ square matrices with rational entries spanned by the identity matrix $\mathbf I$, the image of the number $1$, and a matrix $\mathbf\Phi$, the image of $\varphi$. Thus arithmetic of numbers in $\Q\bigl(\;\!\!\sqrt5\;\!\bigr)$ can be alternately represented by the arithmetic of such matrices. In this context, the number $\alpha = a + b\varphi$ is represented by the matrix $\mathbf A = a\mathbf I + b \mathbf \Phi$. A convenient choice of basis for $\Q\bigl(\;\!\!\sqrt5\;\!\bigr)$ is $( 1, \varphi)$, in terms of which $\mathbf\Phi$ is a symmetric matrix:
$$\begin{align}
& \mathbf I = \begin{bmatrix} 1 & 0 \\ 0 & 1 \end{bmatrix}, \quad
\mathbf\Phi = \begin{bmatrix} 0 & 1 \\ 1 & 1 \end{bmatrix}, \quad
\mathbf A = a\mathbf I + b\mathbf\Phi = \begin{bmatrix} a & b \\ b & a + b \end{bmatrix}. \quad
\end{align}$$

The adjugate matrix $\overline{\mathbf\Phi} = \mathbf I - \mathbf\Phi$ represents the algebraic conjugate $\overline\varphi = 1 - \varphi$, the matrix $\mathbf R = -\mathbf I + 2\mathbf\Phi$ (satisfying $\textstyle \mathbf R^2 = 5 \mathbf I$) represents $\sqrt5$, and the adjugate of an arbitrary element $\mathbf A$, which we will denote $\overline{\mathbf A} = a\mathbf I + b \overline{\mathbf\Phi}$, represents the number $\overline\alpha = a + b\overline\varphi$:
$$\begin{align}
& \mathbf R = \begin{bmatrix} -1 & 2 \\ 2 & 1 \end{bmatrix}, \quad
\overline{\mathbf\Phi} = \begin{bmatrix} \;1 & -1 \\ -1 & \,0 \end{bmatrix}, \quad
\overline{\mathbf A} = a\mathbf I + b\overline{\mathbf\Phi} = \begin{bmatrix} a+b & -b\; \\ -b & \;a \end{bmatrix}.
\end{align}$$

Every matrix $\mathbf A = a\mathbf I + b \mathbf \Phi$, except for the zero matrix, is invertible, and its inverse $\textstyle \mathbf A^{-1} = \bigl(1/\mathrm{det}(\mathbf A)\bigr) \overline{\mathbf A}$ represents the multiplicative inverse $\textstyle \alpha^{-1} = \overline\alpha / \mathrm{N}(\alpha)$ in $\Q\bigl(\;\!\!\sqrt5\;\!\bigr)$.

If $\alpha = a + b\varphi$ is an element of $\Q\bigl(\;\!\!\sqrt5\;\!\bigr)$, with conjugate $\overline\alpha = a + b\overline\varphi$, then the matrix $\mathbf A = a\mathbf I + b\mathbf \Phi$ has the numbers $\alpha$ and $\overline\alpha$ as its eigenvalues. Its trace is $\mathrm{tr}(\mathbf A) = {}\!$$2a + b = {}\!$$\mathrm{tr}(\alpha)$. Its determinant is $\mathrm{det}(\mathbf A) = {}\!$$\textstyle a^2 + ab - b^2 = {}\!$$\mathrm{N}(\alpha)$. The characteristic polynomial of $\mathbf A$ is $(x - \alpha)(x - \overline\alpha)$, which is the minimal polynomial of $\alpha$ and $\overline\alpha$ whenever $b$ is not zero. These properties are shared by the adjugate matrix $\overline{\mathbf A}$. Their product is $\mathbf A \overline{\mathbf A} = \mathrm{det}(\mathbf A)\mathbf I$.

These matrices have especially been studied in the context of the Fibonacci numbers $F_n$ and Lucas numbers $L_n$, which appear as the entries of $\textstyle \mathbf\Phi^n$ and $\textstyle \mathbf\Phi^n \mathbf R$, respectively:
$$\begin{align}
\mathbf\Phi^n &= F_{n-1}\mathbf I + F_n\mathbf\Phi = \begin{bmatrix} F_{n-1} & F_n\; \\ F_n\; & F_{n+1} \end{bmatrix}, & \mathrm{tr}(\mathbf\Phi^n) &= L_n, \\[8mu]
\mathbf\Phi^n\mathbf R &= L_{n-1}\mathbf I + L_n\mathbf\Phi = \begin{bmatrix} L_{n-1} & L_n\; \\ L_n\; & L_{n+1} \end{bmatrix}, & \mathrm{tr}(\mathbf\Phi^n\mathbf R) &= 5F_n.
\end{align}$$
Powers of $\mathbf\Phi$ are sometimes called Fibonacci matrices.

Every matrix of the form $a\mathbf I + b\mathbf \Phi$ has eigenvectors which point along the directions
$$\textstyle \begin{bmatrix} 1 & \!\varphi \end{bmatrix}{}^\mathsf{T}$$
and
$$\textstyle \begin{bmatrix} 1 & \!\overline\varphi \end{bmatrix}{}^\mathsf{T} \!$$
. When numbers in $\Q\bigl(\;\!\!\sqrt5\;\!\bigr)$ are plotted, as above, in a coordinate system where their values as real numbers are the horizontal axis and the values of their conjugates are the vertical axis, the eigenvectors point along those two axes. (Zero is the only number $\Q\bigl(\;\!\!\sqrt5\;\!\bigr)$ directly on either axis.) The matrices $\mathbf \Phi^{2n}$ for integer $n$, representing units, and more generally any matrices with $a + b\varphi > 0$ and determinant $1$, are squeeze mappings, which stretch the plane along one axis and squish it along the other, fixing hyperbolas of constant norm. The matrices $\mathbf \Phi^{2n + 1}$ and more generally matrices with $a + b\varphi > 0$ and determinant $-1$, are the composition of a squeeze mapping and a vertical reflection. The negative identity matrix $- \mathbf I$ is a point reflection across the origin. In general any other matrix $a\mathbf I + b\mathbf \Phi$ can be decomposed as the product of a squeeze mapping, possibly a reflection, and a uniform scaling by the square root of the absolute value of its determinant.

== Other properties ==
The golden field is the real quadratic field with the smallest discriminant, $\Delta_{\Q\left(\;\!\!\sqrt5\right)} = 5$. It has class number 1, which means that the ring of its algebraic integers is a principal ideal domain and a unique factorization domain.

Any positive element of the golden field can be written as a generalized type of continued fraction, in which the partial quotients are sums of non-negative powers of $\varphi$.

== Fibonacci numbers ==
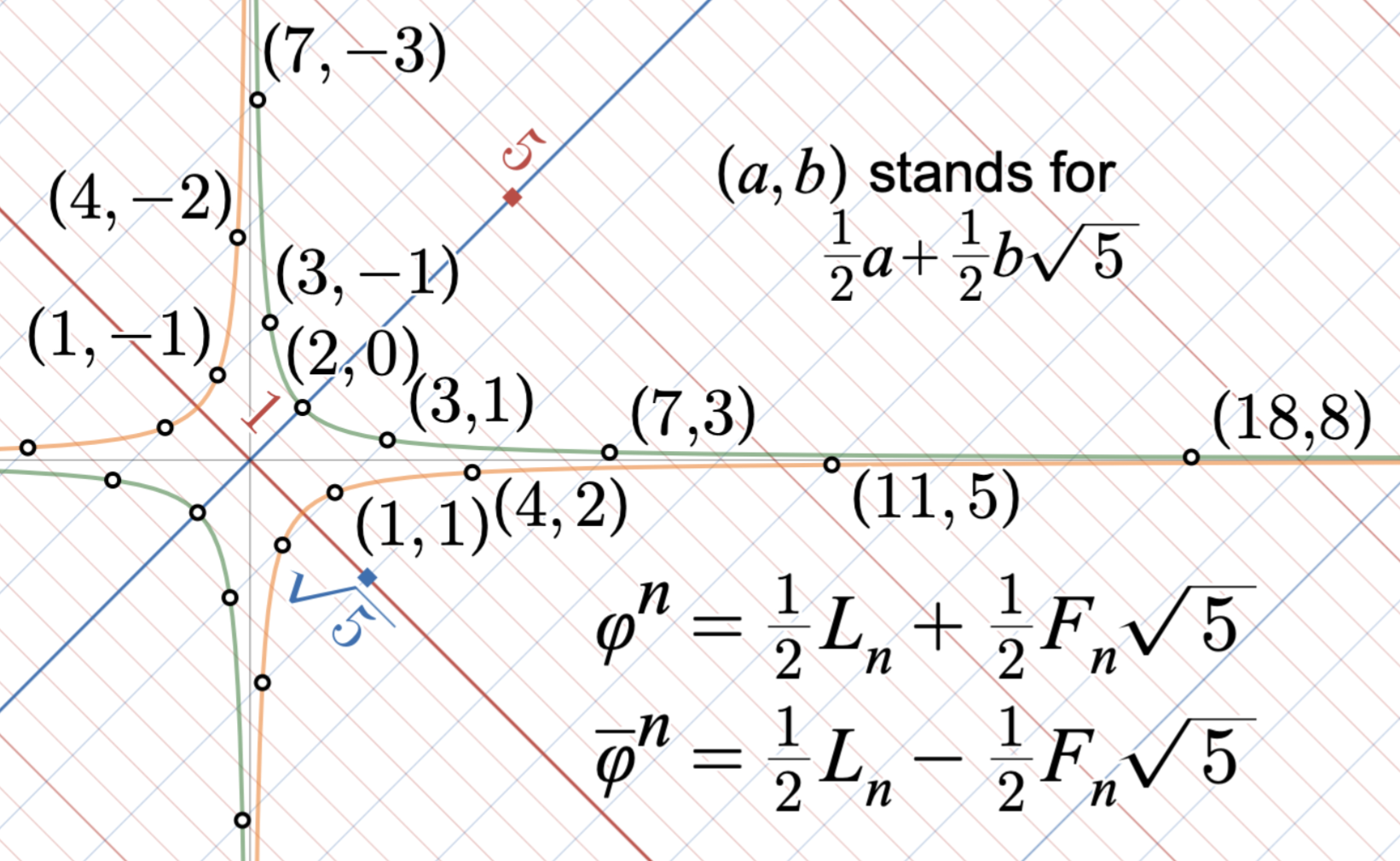
The Lucas and Fibonacci numbers are components of φ^{n} when written in terms of 1/2 and 1/2√5.

$\Q\bigl(\;\!\!\sqrt5\;\!\bigr)$ is a natural choice of number system for studying the Fibonacci numbers $F_n$ and the Lucas numbers $L_n$. These number sequences are usually defined by recurrence relations similar to the one satisfied by the powers of $\varphi$ and $\overline\varphi$:
$$\begin{align}
F_0 &= 0,& F_1 &= 1,& F_{n+1} &= F_n + F_{n-1}, \\[3mu]
L_0 &= 2,& L_1 &= 1,& L_{n+1} &= L_n + L_{n-1}, \\[3mu]
\varphi^0 &= 1,
& \varphi^1 &= \varphi,
& \varphi^{n+1} &= \varphi^{n} + \varphi^{n-1}, \\[3mu]
\overline\varphi^0 &= 1,
& \overline\varphi^1 &= \overline\varphi,
& \overline\varphi^{n+1} &= \overline\varphi^{n} + \overline\varphi^{n-1}.
\end{align}$$

The sequences $F_n$ and $L_n$ respectively begin:

| $\boldsymbol n$ | $\phantom0 0$ | $\phantom0 1$ | $\phantom0 2$ | $\phantom0 3$ | $\phantom0 4$ | $\phantom0 5$ | $\phantom0 6$ | $\phantom0 7$ | $\phantom0 8$ | $\phantom0 9$ | $10$ | $11$ | $12$ | $\ldots$ |
| $\boldsymbol {F_n}$ | $0$ | $1$ | $1$ | $2$ | $3$ | $5$ | $8$ | $13$ | $21$ | $34$ | $55$ | $89$ | $144$ | $\ldots$ |
| $\boldsymbol {L_n}$ | $2$ | $1$ | $3$ | $4$ | $7$ | $11$ | $18$ | $29$ | $47$ | $76$ | $123$ | $199$ | $322$ | $\ldots$ |

Both sequences can be consistently extended to negative integer indices by following the same recurrence in the negative direction. They satisfy the identities
$$\begin{align}
F_{-n} &= (-1)^{n+1} F_n, \\
L_{-n} &= (-1)^{n} L_n.
\end{align}$$

The Fibonacci and Lucas numbers can alternately be expressed as the components $b$ and $a$ when a power of the golden ratio or its conjugate is written in the form $\tfrac12a + \tfrac12b\sqrt5$:
$$\begin{align}
\varphi^n &= \tfrac12L_n + \tfrac12F_n\sqrt5, \\[3mu]
\overline\varphi^n &= \tfrac12L_n - \tfrac12F_n\sqrt5.
\end{align}$$

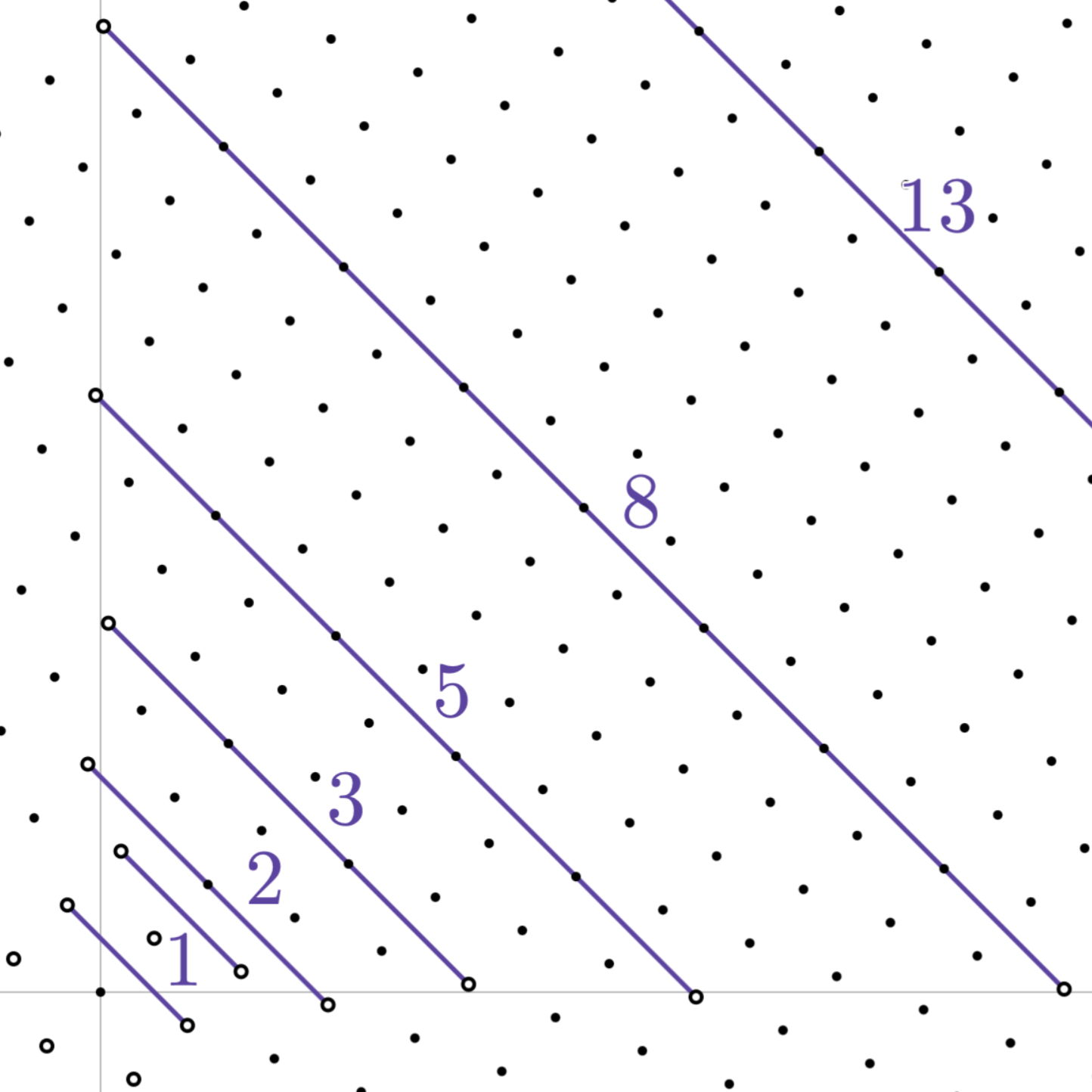
Binet's formula for Fibonacci numbers plotted in the lattice of golden integers

The expression of the Fibonacci numbers in terms of $\varphi$ is called Binet's formula:

$$\begin{align}
F_n &= \frac{\varphi^n - \overline\varphi^n}{\varphi - \overline\varphi}
= \frac{\varphi^n - \overline\varphi^n }{\sqrt5 }
= \frac{ \mathrm{tr}\bigl(\varphi^n\sqrt5\;\!\bigr)}{5}, \\[5mu]
L_n &= \frac{\varphi^n + \overline\varphi^n}{\varphi + \overline\varphi}
= \varphi^n + \overline\varphi^n
= \mathrm{tr}{\left(\varphi^n\right)}.
\end{align}$$

The powers of $\varphi$ or $\overline\varphi$, when written in the form $a + b\varphi$, can be expressed in terms of just Fibonacci numbers,
$$\begin{align}
\varphi^n &= F_{n-1} + F_n\varphi, \\[3mu]
\overline\varphi^n &= F_{n-1} + F_n\overline\varphi = F_{n+1} - F_n\varphi.
\end{align}$$
Powers of $\varphi$ or $\overline\varphi$ times $\sqrt5$ can be expressed in terms of just Lucas numbers,
$$\begin{align}
\varphi^n\sqrt5 &= L_{n-1} + L_n\varphi, \\[3mu]
\overline\varphi^n\sqrt5 &= - L_{n-1} - L_n\overline\varphi = -L_{n+1} + L_n\varphi.
\end{align}$$
Statements about golden integers can be recast as statements about the Fibonacci or Lucas numbers; for example, that every power of $\varphi$ is a unit of $\Z[\varphi]$, $\textstyle \mathrm{N}(\varphi^n) = {\mathrm{N}(\varphi)}^n = {(-1)}^n$, when expanded, becomes Cassini's identity, and likewise $\textstyle \mathrm{N}(\varphi^n\sqrt5) = {\mathrm{N}(\varphi)}^n\mathrm{N}\bigl(\sqrt5\bigr) = {(-1)}^n5$ becomes the analogous identity about Lucas numbers,
$$\begin{align}
(F_{n-1} + F_n\varphi)(F_{n+1} - F_n\varphi) &= F_{n-1}F_{n+1} - F_n^2 = (-1)^n, \\[3mu]
(L_{n-1} + L_n\varphi)(-L_{n+1} + L_n\varphi) &= L_n^2 - L_{n-1}L_{n+1} = (-1)^n5.
\end{align}$$

The numbers $\textstyle \varphi^n$ and $\textstyle \overline\varphi^n$ are the roots of the quadratic polynomial $\textstyle x^2 - L_nx + (-1)^n$. This is the minimal polynomial for $\textstyle \varphi^n$ for any non-zero integer $n$. The quadratic polynomial $\textstyle x^2 - 5F_nx + (-1)^{n+1}5$ is the minimal polynomial for $\textstyle \varphi^n\sqrt5$.

In the limit, consecutive Fibonacci or Lucas numbers approach a ratio of $\varphi$, and the ratio of Lucas to Fibonacci numbers approaches $\sqrt5$:
$$\begin{align}
\lim_{n \to \infty} \frac {F_{n+1}}{F_n} &= \lim_{n \to \infty} \frac{L_{n+1}}{L_n} = \varphi,
& \lim_{n \to \infty} \frac {L_n}{F_n} &= \sqrt5.
\end{align}$$

Theorems about the Fibonacci numbers – for example, divisibility properties such as if $n$ divides $m$ then $F_n$ divides $F_m$ – can be conveniently proven using $\Q\bigl(\;\!\!\sqrt5\;\!\bigr)$.

== Relation to fivefold symmetry ==
The golden ratio $\varphi = \tfrac12\bigl(1 + \sqrt5\;\!\bigr)$ is the ratio between the lengths of a diagonal and a side of a regular pentagon, so the golden field and golden integers feature prominently in the metrical geometry of the regular pentagon and its symmetry system, as well as higher-dimensional objects and symmetries involving five-fold symmetry.

=== Euclidean plane ===
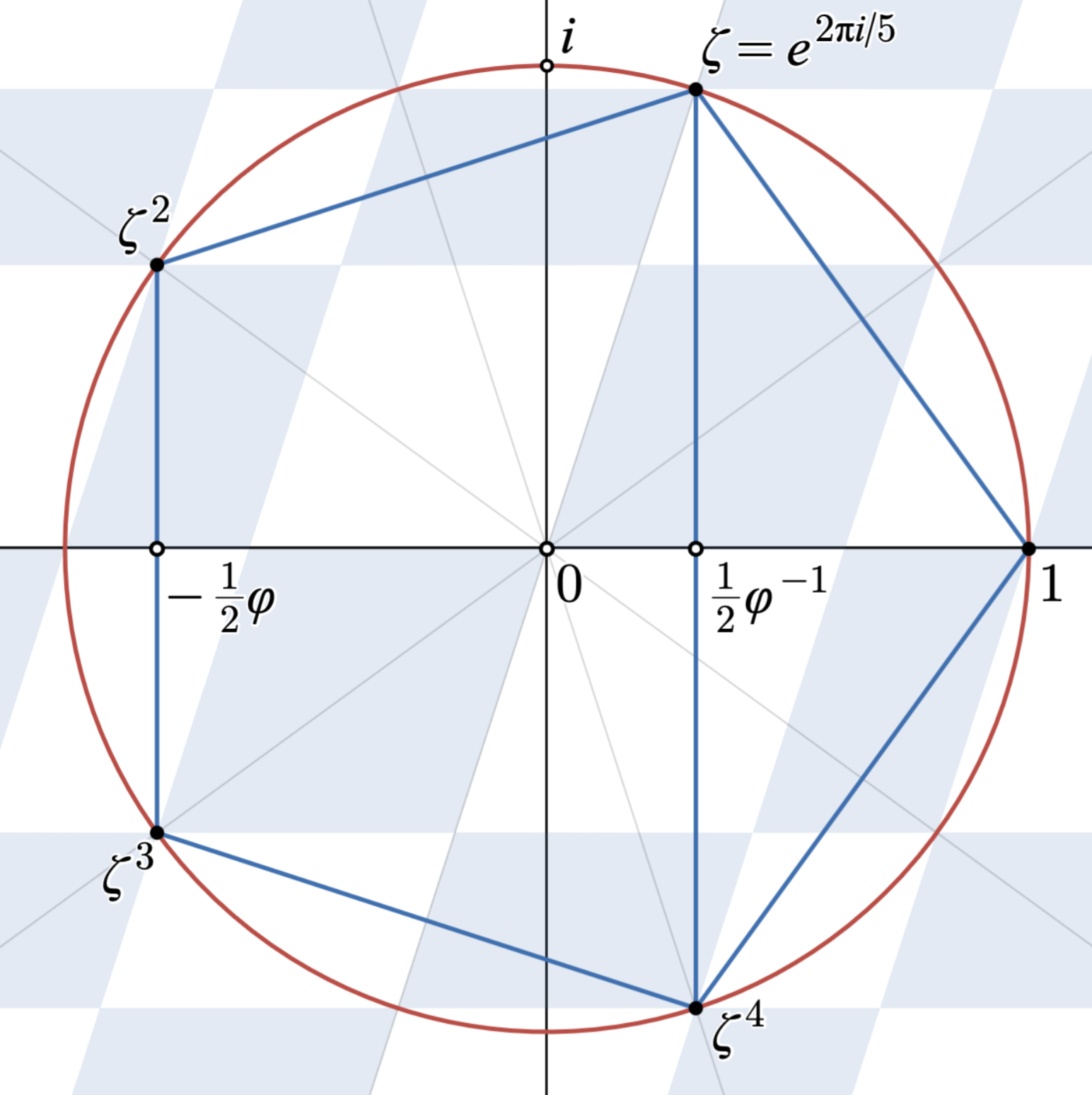
The golden ratio is related to the fifth roots of unity.

Let $\zeta = {\exp}\bigl(2\pi i/5 \bigr)$ be the 5th root of unity, a complex number of unit absolute value spaced $\tfrac15$ of a full turn from $1$ around the unit circle, satisfying $\textstyle \zeta^5 = 1$. Then the fifth cyclotomic field $\Q(\zeta)$ is the field extension of the rational numbers formed by adjoining $\zeta$ (or equivalently, adjoining any of $\textstyle \zeta^2$, $\textstyle \zeta^3$ or $\textstyle \zeta^4$). Elements of $\Q(\zeta)$ are numbers of the form $\textstyle a_0 + a_1\zeta + {}$$a_2\zeta^2 + {}$$a_3\zeta^3 + a_4\zeta^4$, with rational coefficients. $\Q(\zeta)$ is of degree four over the rational numbers: any four of the five roots are linearly independent over $\Q$, but all five sum to zero. However, $\Q(\zeta)$ is only of degree two over $\Q\bigl(\;\!\!\sqrt5\;\!\bigr)$,
$$\begin{align}
x^5 - 1 &= (x - 1)\bigl(x^4 + x^3 + x^2 + x + 1\bigr) \\[2mu]
&= (x - 1)\bigl(x^2 + \overline \varphi x + 1\bigr)\bigl(x^2 + \varphi x + 1\bigr) \\[2mu]
&= (x - 1)\bigl(x - \zeta\bigr)\bigl(x - \zeta^4\bigr)\bigl(x - \zeta^2\bigr)\bigl(x - \zeta^3\bigr),
\end{align}$$
where the conjugate $\overline \varphi = 1 - \varphi$. The elements of $\Q(\zeta)$ can alternately be represented as $\alpha + \beta\zeta$, where $\alpha$ and $\beta$ are elements of $\Q\bigl(\;\!\!\sqrt5\;\!\bigr)$:
$$\begin{align}
& a_0 + a_1\zeta + a_2\zeta^2 + a_3\zeta^3 + a_4\zeta^4 \\[3mu]
&\qquad = \bigl(a_0 - a_2 + \overline \varphi a_3 - \overline \varphi a_4\bigr) + \bigl(a_1 - \overline \varphi a_2 + \overline \varphi a_3 - a_4 \bigr)\zeta.
\end{align}$$

Conversely, $\Q\bigl(\;\!\!\sqrt5\;\!\bigr)$ is a subfield of $\Q(\zeta)$. For any primitive root of unity $\zeta_n$, the maximal real subfield of the cyclotomic field $\Q(\zeta_n)$ is the field $\Q(\zeta_n + \zeta_n^{-1})$; see Minimal polynomial of $2\cos(2\pi/n)$. In our case $n = 5$, $\textstyle (\zeta + \zeta^{-1}{)}^2 + {}$$(\zeta + \zeta^{-1}) - 1 = 0$, so $\zeta + \zeta^{-1}$ is the positive root of the quadratic polynomial $\textstyle x^2 + x - 1$, namely $\textstyle \varphi^{-1}$, and the maximal real subfield of $\Q(\zeta)$ is $\Q\bigl(\;\!\!\sqrt5\;\!\bigr)$.

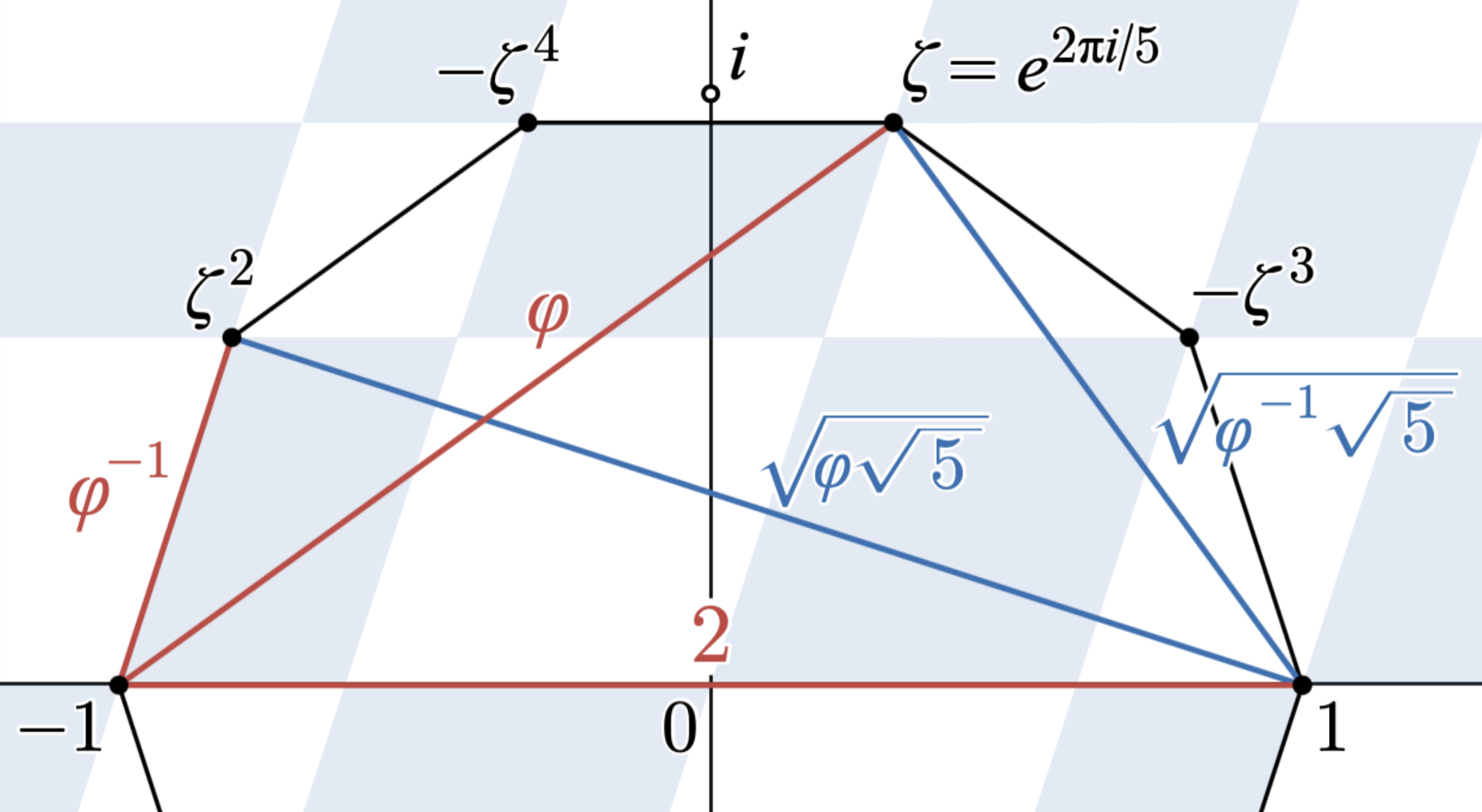
Diagonals of a unit-circumradius regular decagon are square roots of golden integers.

The squared absolute value of any element of $\Q(\zeta)$ is an element of $\Q\bigl(\;\!\!\sqrt5\;\!\bigr)$:
$$\begin{align}
|\alpha + \beta\zeta|^2 &= (\alpha + \beta\zeta)(\alpha + \beta\zeta^{-1}) = \alpha^2 + \beta^2 + \alpha\beta\varphi^{-1}.
\end{align}$$
In particular, the squared length of the side of a regular pentagon of unit circumradius is $\textstyle |\zeta - 1|{}^2 = {}$$2+\overline\varphi = {}$$\textstyle \varphi^{-1}\sqrt5$ and the squared length of its diagonal is $\textstyle |\zeta^2 - 1|{}^2 = {}$$2+\varphi = {}$$\varphi\sqrt5$; these two numbers are conjugates, associates of $\sqrt5$. In a regular decagon with unit circumradius, the squared length of a side is $\textstyle |\zeta^2 + 1|{}^2 = \varphi^{-2}$ and the squared length of a diagonal between vertices three apart is $\textstyle |\zeta + 1|{}^2 = \textstyle \varphi^2$.

Golden integers are involved in the trigonometric study of fivefold symmetries. By the quadratic formula,
$$\begin{alignat}{3}
\zeta &= \tfrac12\bigl({-\overline\varphi} + {\textstyle \sqrt{\,\overline\varphi{}^2 - 4}}\;\!\bigr)
&{}= -\tfrac12\overline\varphi + \tfrac12\sqrt{-2 - \varphi }, \\[6mu]
\zeta^2 &= \tfrac12\bigl({-\varphi} + {\textstyle \sqrt{\varphi{}^2 - 4}}\;\!\bigr)
&{}= -\tfrac12\varphi + {\textstyle \tfrac12\sqrt{-2 - \overline\varphi } }.
\end{alignat}$$

Angles of $\tfrac25\pi$ and $\tfrac45\pi$ thus have golden rational cosines but their sines are the square roots of golden rational numbers.
$$\begin{align}
\cos\tfrac25\pi &= -\tfrac12\overline\varphi, & \sin\tfrac25\pi &= \tfrac12\sqrt{2+\varphi}, \\[6mu]
\cos\tfrac45\pi &= -\tfrac12\varphi,          & \sin\tfrac45\pi &= \tfrac12{\textstyle \sqrt{2+\overline\varphi}}.
\end{align}$$

=== Three-dimensional space ===
A regular icosahedron with edge length $2$ can be oriented so that the Cartesian coordinates of its vertices are
$$\left(0, \pm 1, \pm \varphi \right), \left(\pm 1, \pm \varphi, 0 \right), \left(\pm \varphi, 0, \pm 1 \right).$$

=== Four-dimensional space ===
The 600-cell is a regular 4-polytope with 120 vertices, 720 edges, 1200 triangular faces, and 600 tetrahedral cells. It has kaleidoscopic symmetry $[5, 3, 3]$ generated by four mirrors which can be conveniently oriented as $\sqrt5 x_1 = x_2 + x_3 + x_4$, $x_1 = x_2$, $x_2 = x_3$, and $x_3 = x_4$. Then the 120 vertices have golden-integer coordinates: arbitrary permutations of $\textstyle (\varphi, \varphi, \varphi, \varphi^{-2})$ and $\textstyle (\varphi^{-1}, \varphi^{-1}, \varphi^{-1}, \varphi^2)$ with an even number of minus signs, $(1, 1, 1, \sqrt5)$ with an odd number of minus signs, and $(\pm2, \pm2, 0, 0)$.

=== Higher dimensions ===
The icosians are a special set of quaternions that are used in a construction of the E_{8} lattice. Each component of an icosian always belongs to the golden field. The icosians of unit norm are the vertices of a 600-cell.

== Quasiperiodicity ==
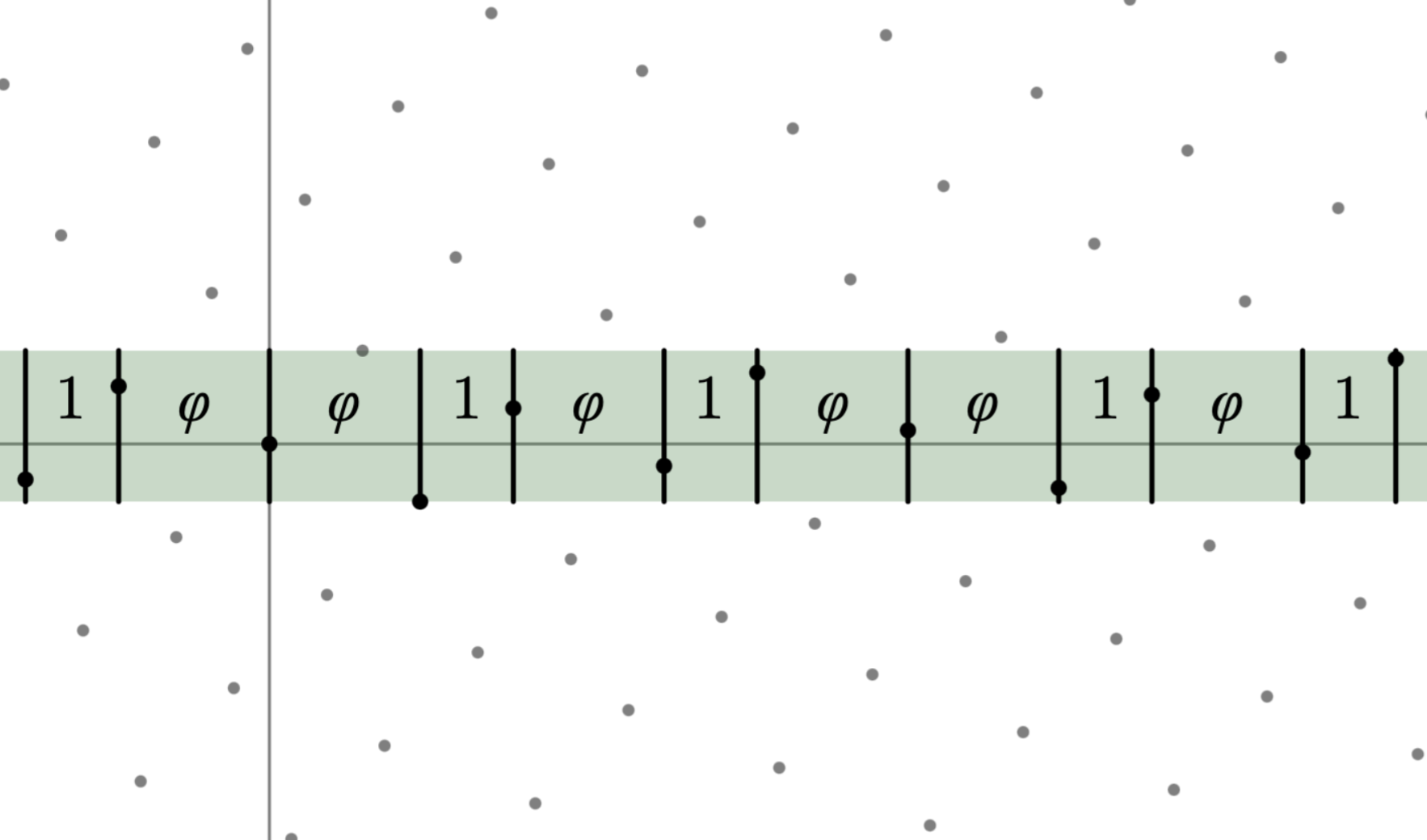
The Fibonacci chain, a one-dimensional quasicrystal, constructed by the cut-and-project method

Golden integers are used in studying quasicrystals.

== Other applications ==
The quintic case of Fermat's Last Theorem, that there are no nontrivial integer solutions to the equation $\textstyle a^5 + b^5 = c^5$, was proved using $\Q\bigl(\;\!\!\sqrt5\;\!\bigr)$ by Gustav Lejeune Dirichlet and Adrien-Marie Legendre in 1825–1830.

In enumerative geometry, it is proven that every non-singular cubic surface contains exactly 27 lines. The Clebsch surface is unusual in that all 27 lines can be defined over the real numbers. They can, in fact, be defined over the golden field.

In quantum information theory, an abelian extension of the golden field is used in a construction of a SIC-POVM in four-dimensional complex vector space.
