= Genus character =

Concept in number theory

In number theory, a genus character of a quadratic number field K is a character of the genus group of K. In other words, it is a real character of the narrow class group of K. Reinterpreting this using the Artin map, the collection of genus characters can also be thought of as the unramified real characters of the absolute Galois group of K (i.e. the characters that factor through the Galois group of the genus field of K).
