= Heegner's lemma =

Criterion for existence of polynomial roots

In mathematics, Heegner's lemma is a lemma used by Kurt Heegner in his paper on the class number problem. His lemma states that if

$$y^2=a_4x^4+a_3x^3+a_2x^2+a_1x+a_0$$

is a curve over a field with a_{4} not a square, then it has a solution if it has a solution in an extension of odd degree.
