= CM-field =

Complex multiplication field

In mathematics, a CM-field is a particular type of number field, so named for a close connection to the theory of complex multiplication. Another name used is J-field.

The abbreviation "CM" was introduced by Shimura and Taniyama.

== Formal definition ==
A number field $K$ is a CM-field if it is a quadratic extension $K/F$ where the base field $F$ is totally real but $K$ is totally imaginary; i.e., every embedding of $F$ into $\C$ lies entirely within $\R$, but there is no embedding of $K$ into $\R$.

In other words, there is a subfield $F$ of $K$ such that $K$ is generated over $F$ by a single square root of an element, say $\beta = \sqrt{\alpha}$, in such a way that the minimal polynomial of $\beta$ over the rational number field $\Q$ has all its roots non-real complex numbers. For this α should be chosen totally negative, so that for each embedding σ of $F$ into the real number field, $\sigma(\alpha) < 0$.

== Properties ==
One feature of a CM-field is that complex conjugation on $\C$ induces an automorphism on the field which is independent of its embedding into $\mathbb C$. In the notation given, it must negate $\beta$.

A number field $K$ is a CM-field if and only if it has a "units defect", i.e. if it contains a proper subfield $F$ whose unit group has the same $\mathbb Z$-rank as that of $K$. In fact, $F$ is the totally real subfield of $K$ mentioned above. This follows from Dirichlet's unit theorem.

== Examples ==
- The simplest, and motivating, example of a CM-field is an imaginary quadratic field, for which the totally real subfield is just the field of rationals.
- One of the most important examples of a CM-field is the cyclotomic field $\Q(\zeta_n)$, which is generated by a primitive $n$th root of unity. It is a totally imaginary quadratic extension of the totally real field $\Q(\zeta_n +\zeta_n^{-1})$. The latter is the fixed field of complex conjugation, and $\Q(\zeta_n)$ is obtained from it by adjoining a square root of $(\zeta_n+\zeta_n^{-1})^2-4 = (\zeta_n - \zeta_n^{-1})^2.$
- The union $\Q^\mathrm{CM}$ of all CM fields is similar to a CM field except that it has infinite degree. It is a quadratic extension of the union of all totally real fields $\Q^\mathrm{R}$. The absolute Galois group $\operatorname{Gal}(\overline{\Q}/\Q^\mathrm{R})$ is generated (as a closed subgroup) by all elements of order 2 in $\operatorname{Gal}(\overline{\Q}/\Q)$, and $\operatorname{Gal}(\overline{\Q}/\Q^\mathrm{CM})$ is a subgroup of index 2. The Galois group $\operatorname{Gal}(\Q^\mathrm{CM}/\Q)$ has a center generated by an element of order 2 (complex conjugation) and the quotient by its center is the group $\operatorname{Gal}(\Q^\mathrm{R}/\Q)$.
- If $V$ is a complex abelian variety of dimension $n$, then any abelian algebra $F$ of endomorphisms of $V$ has rank at most $2n$ over $\Z$. If it has rank $2n$ and $V$ is simple then $F$ is an order in a CM-field. Conversely any CM field arises like this from some simple complex abelian variety, unique up to isogeny.
- One example of a totally imaginary field which is not CM is the number field defined by the polynomial $x^4 + x^3 - x^2 - x + 1$.
