= Kleinian integer =

In mathematical cryptography, a Kleinian integer is a complex number of the form $m+n\frac{1+\sqrt{-7}}{2}$, with m and n rational integers. They are named after Felix Klein.

The Kleinian integers form a ring called the Kleinian ring, which is the ring of integers in the imaginary quadratic field $\mathbb{Q}(\sqrt{-7})$. This ring is a unique factorization domain.

== See also ==
- Eisenstein integer
- Gaussian integer
