= Ideal class group =

In number theory, measure of non-unique factorization

In mathematics, the ideal class group (or class group) of an algebraic number field $K$ is the quotient group $J_K/P_K$ where $J_K$ is the group of fractional ideals of the ring of integers of $K$, and $P_K$ is its subgroup of principal ideals. The class group is a measure of the extent to which unique factorization fails in the ring of integers of $K$. The order of the group, which is finite, is called the class number of $K$.

The theory extends to Dedekind domains and their fields of fractions, for which the multiplicative properties are intimately tied to the structure of the class group. For example, the class group of a Dedekind domain is trivial if and only if the ring is a unique factorization domain.

== History and origin of the ideal class group ==
Ideal class groups (or, rather, what were effectively ideal class groups) were studied some time before the idea of an ideal was formulated. These groups appeared in the theory of quadratic forms: in the case of binary integral quadratic forms, as put into something like a final form by Carl Friedrich Gauss, a composition law was defined on certain equivalence classes of forms. This gave a finite abelian group, as was recognised at the time.

Later Ernst Kummer was working towards a theory of cyclotomic fields. It had been realised (probably by several people) that failure to complete proofs in the general case of Fermat's Last Theorem by factorisation using the roots of unity was for a very good reason: a failure of unique factorization – i.e., the fundamental theorem of arithmetic – to hold in the rings generated by those roots of unity was a major obstacle. Out of Kummer's work for the first time came a study of the obstruction to the factorization. We now recognise this as part of the ideal class group: in fact Kummer had isolated the $p$-torsion in that group for the field of $p$-roots of unity, for any prime number $p$, as the reason for the failure of the standard method of attack on the Fermat problem (see regular prime).

Somewhat later again Richard Dedekind formulated the concept of an ideal, Kummer having worked in a different way. At this point the existing examples could be unified. It was shown that while rings of algebraic integers do not always have unique factorization into primes (because they need not be principal ideal domains), they do have the property that every proper ideal admits a unique factorization as a product of prime ideals (that is, every ring of algebraic integers is a Dedekind domain). The size of the ideal class group can be considered as a measure for the deviation of a ring from being a principal ideal domain; a ring is a principal ideal domain if and only if it has a trivial ideal class group.

== Definition ==
If $R$ is an integral domain, define a relation $\sim$ on nonzero fractional ideals of $R$ by $I\sim J$ whenever there exist nonzero elements $a$ and $b$ of $R$ such that $(a)I=(b)J$. It is easily shown that this is an equivalence relation. The equivalence classes are called the ideal classes of $R$. Ideal classes can be multiplied: if $[I]$ denotes the equivalence class of the ideal $I$, then the multiplication $[I][J]=[IJ]$ is well-defined and commutative. The principal ideals form the ideal class $[R]$ which serves as an identity element for this multiplication. Thus a class $[I]$ has an inverse $[J]$ if and only if there is an ideal $J$ such that $IJ$ is a principal ideal. In general, such a $J$ may not exist and consequently the set of ideal classes of $R$ may only be a monoid.

However, if $R$ is the ring of algebraic integers in an algebraic number field, or more generally a Dedekind domain, the multiplication defined above turns the set of fractional ideal classes into an abelian group, the ideal class group of $R$. The group property of existence of inverse elements follows easily from the fact that, in a Dedekind domain, every non-zero ideal (except $R$) is a product of prime ideals.

== Properties ==
The ideal class group is trivial (i.e. has only one element) if and only if all ideals of $R$ are principal. In this sense, the ideal class group measures how far $R$ is from being a principal ideal domain, and hence from satisfying unique prime factorization (Dedekind domains are unique factorization domains if and only if they are principal ideal domains).

The number of ideal classes—the class number of $R$—may be infinite in general. In fact, every abelian group is isomorphic to the ideal class group of some Dedekind domain. But if $R$ is a ring of algebraic integers, then the class number is always finite. This is one of the main results of classical algebraic number theory.

Computation of the class group is hard, in general; it can be done by hand for the ring of integers in an algebraic number field of small discriminant, using Minkowski's bound. This result gives a bound, depending on the ring, such that every ideal class contains an ideal norm less than the bound. In general the bound is not sharp enough to make the calculation practical for fields with large discriminant, but computers are well suited to the task.

The mapping from rings of integers $R$ to their corresponding class groups is functorial, and the class group can be subsumed under the heading of algebraic K-theory, with $K_0(R)$ being the functor assigning to $R$ its ideal class group; more precisely, $K_0(R)=\Z\times C(R)$, where $C(R)$ is the class group. Higher $K$-groups can also be employed and interpreted arithmetically in connection to rings of integers.

== Relation with the group of units ==
It was remarked above that the ideal class group provides part of the answer to the question of how much ideals in a Dedekind domain behave like elements. The other part of the answer is provided by the group of units of the Dedekind domain, since passage from principal ideals to their generators requires the use of units (and this is the rest of the reason for introducing the concept of fractional ideal, as well).

Define a map from $K^\times$ to the set of all nonzero fractional ideals of $R$ by sending every element to the fractional ideal it generates. This is a group homomorphism; its kernel is the group of units of $R$, and its cokernel is the ideal class group of $R$. The failure of these groups to be trivial is a measure of the failure of the map to be an isomorphism: that is the failure of ideals to act like ring elements, that is to say, like numbers.

== Examples of ideal class groups ==
- The rings $\Z, \Z[i]$, and $\Z[\omega]$, respectively the integers, Gaussian integers, and Eisenstein integers, are all principal ideal domains (and in fact are all Euclidean domains), and so have class number 1: i.e., they have trivial ideal class groups.
- If $K$ is a field, then the polynomial ring $K[x_1,x_2,x_3,\dots]$ is an integral domain. It has a countably infinite set of ideal classes.

=== Class numbers of quadratic fields ===
If $d$ is a square-free integer (a product of distinct primes) other than 1, then $\Q(\sqrt{d})$ is a quadratic extension of $\Q$. If $d < 0$, then the class number of the ring $R$ of algebraic integers of $\Q(\sqrt{d})$ is equal to 1 for precisely the following values of $d$: $d = -1,-2,-3,-7,-11, -19, -43, -67, -163$. This result was first conjectured by Gauss and proven by Kurt Heegner, although Heegner's proof was not believed until Harold Stark gave a later proof in 1967 (see Stark–Heegner theorem). This is a special case of the famous class number problem.

If, on the other hand, $d > 0$, then it is unknown whether there are infinitely many fields $\Q(\sqrt{d})$ with class number 1. Computational results indicate that there are a great many such fields. However, it is not even known if there are infinitely many number fields with class number 1.

For $d < 0$, the ideal class group of $\Q(\sqrt{d})$ is isomorphic to the class group of integral binary quadratic forms of discriminant equal to the discriminant of $\Q(\sqrt{d})$. For $d > 0$, the ideal class group may be half the size since the class group of integral binary quadratic forms is isomorphic to the narrow class group of $\Q(\sqrt{d})$.

For real quadratic integer rings, the class number is given in OEIS A003649; for the imaginary case, they are given in OEIS A000924.

==== Example of a non-trivial class group ====
The quadratic integer ring $R=\Z[\sqrt{-5}]$ is the ring of integers of $\Q(\sqrt{-5})$. It does not possess unique factorization; in fact the class group of $R$ is cyclic of order 2. Indeed, the ideal

$$J=(2,1+\sqrt{-5})$$

is not principal, which can be proved by contradiction as follows: $R$ has a multiplicative norm function defined by $N(a + b \sqrt{-5}) = a^2 + 5 b^2$, which satisfies $N(u) = 1$ if and only if $u$ is a unit in $R$.

Firstly, $J \neq R$, because the quotient ring of $R$ modulo the ideal $(1 + \sqrt{-5})$ is isomorphic to $\Z / 6\Z$, so that the quotient ring of $R$ modulo $J$ is isomorphic to $\Z / 3\Z$. Now if $J=(a)$ were principal (that is, generated by an element $a$ of $R$), then $a$ would divide both $2$ and $1+\sqrt{-5}$. Then the norm $N(a)$ would divide both $N(2) = 4$ and $N(1 + \sqrt{-5}) = 6$, so $N(a)$ would divide 2. If $N(a) = 1$ then $a$ is a unit and so $J = R$, a contradiction. But $N(a)$ cannot be 2 either, because $R$ has no elements of norm 2, because the Diophantine equation $b^2 + 5 c^2 = 2$ has no solutions in integers, as it has no solutions modulo 5.

One also computes that $J^2=(2)$, which is principal, so the class of $J$ in the ideal class group has order two. Showing that there aren't any other ideal classes requires more effort.

The fact that this $J$ is not principal is also related to the fact that the element $6$ has two distinct factorisations into irreducibles:

$$6 = 2\times 3 = (1 + \sqrt{-5})(1 - \sqrt{-5})$$.

== Connections to class field theory ==
Class field theory is a branch of algebraic number theory which seeks to classify all the abelian extensions of a given algebraic number field, meaning Galois extensions with abelian Galois group. A particularly beautiful example is found in the Hilbert class field of a number field, which can be defined as the maximal unramified abelian extension of such a field. The Hilbert class field L of a number field K is unique and has the following properties:

- Every ideal of the ring of integers of K becomes principal in L, i.e., if I is an integral ideal of K then the image of I is a principal ideal in L.
- L is a Galois extension of K with Galois group isomorphic to the ideal class group of K.

Neither property is particularly easy to prove.

== See also ==
- Class number formula
- Class number problem
- Brauer–Siegel theorem—an asymptotic formula for the class number
- List of number fields with class number one
- Principal ideal domain
- Algebraic K-theory
- Galois theory
- Fermat's Last Theorem
- Narrow class group
- Picard group—a generalisation of the class group appearing in algebraic geometry
- Arakelov class group
