= Brauer–Siegel theorem =

Asymptotic result on the behaviour of algebraic number fields

In mathematics, the Brauer–Siegel theorem, named after Richard Brauer and Carl Ludwig Siegel, is an asymptotic result on the behaviour of algebraic number fields, obtained by Richard Brauer and Carl Ludwig Siegel. It attempts to generalise the results known on the class numbers of imaginary quadratic fields, to a more general sequence of number fields

$$K_1, K_2, \ldots.\$$

In all cases other than the rational field Q and imaginary quadratic fields, the regulator R_{i} of K_{i} must be taken into account, because K_{i} then has units of infinite order by Dirichlet's unit theorem. The quantitative hypothesis of the standard Brauer–Siegel theorem is that if D_{i} is the discriminant of K_{i}, then

$$\frac{[K_i : \mathbf Q]}{\log|D_i|} \to 0\text{ as }i \to\infty.$$

Assuming that, and the algebraic hypothesis that K_{i} is a Galois extension of Q, the conclusion is that

$$\frac{ \log(h_i R_i) }{ \log\sqrt{|D_i|} } \to 1\text{ as }i \to\infty$$

where h_{i} is the class number of K_{i}. If one assumes that all the degrees $[K_i : \mathbf Q]$ are bounded above by a uniform constant N, then one may drop the assumption of normality - this is what is actually proved in Brauer's paper.

This result is ineffective, as indeed was the result on quadratic fields on which it built. Effective results in the same direction were initiated in work of Harold Stark from the early 1970s.
