= Totally real number field =

The number field Q(√2) sits inside R, and the two embeddings of the field into C send every element in the field to another element of R, hence the field is totally real.

In number theory, a number field F is called totally real if for each embedding of F into the complex numbers the image lies inside the real numbers. Equivalent conditions are that F is generated over Q by one root of an integer polynomial P, all of the roots of P being real; or that the tensor product algebra of F with the real field, over Q, is isomorphic to a tensor power of R.

For example, quadratic fields F of degree 2 over Q are either real (and then totally real), or complex, depending on whether the square root of a positive or negative number is adjoined to Q. In the case of cubic fields, a cubic integer polynomial P irreducible over Q will have at least one real root. If it has one real and two complex roots the corresponding cubic extension of Q defined by adjoining the real root will not be totally real, although it is a field of real numbers.

Totally real number fields play a significant special role in algebraic number theory. An abelian extension of Q is either totally real, or contains a totally real subfield over which it has degree two.

Any number field that is Galois over the rationals must be either totally real or totally imaginary.

== See also ==
- Totally imaginary number field
- CM-field, a totally imaginary quadratic extension of a totally real field
