= Eisenstein–Kronecker number =

Special numbers in mathematics

In mathematics, Eisenstein–Kronecker numbers are an analogue for imaginary quadratic fields of generalized Bernoulli numbers. They are defined in terms of classical Eisenstein–Kronecker series, which were studied by Kenichi Bannai and Shinichi Kobayashi using the Poincaré bundle.

Eisenstein–Kronecker numbers are algebraic and satisfy congruences that can be used in the construction of two-variable p-adic L-functions. They are related to critical L-values of Hecke characters.

== Definition ==
When A is the area of the fundamental domain of $\Gamma$ divided by $\pi$, where $\Gamma$ is a lattice in $\mathbb{C}$: $e_{a,b}^{*}(z_0,w_0):=\sum_{\gamma\in\Gamma\setminus\{-z_0\}}\frac{(\bar{z_0}+\bar{\gamma})^a}{(z_0+\gamma)^b}\langle\gamma,w_0\rangle_\Gamma,$ when $\mathbb{N}_0:=\mathbb{N}\cup\{0\}, \,\{a,b\in\mathbb{N}_0:b > a+2\},\,z_0,w_0\in\mathbb{C},$
where $\langle z,w\rangle_\Gamma:=e^\frac{z\overline{w}-w\overline{z}}{A}$ and $\overline{z}$ is the complex conjugate of z.
