= Fundamental unit (number theory) =

In algebraic number theory, a fundamental unit is a generator (modulo the roots of unity) for the unit group of the ring of integers of a number field, when that group has rank 1 (i.e. when the unit group modulo its torsion subgroup is infinite cyclic). Dirichlet's unit theorem shows that the unit group has rank 1 exactly when the number field is a real quadratic field, a complex cubic field, or a totally imaginary quartic field. When the unit group has rank ≥ 1, a basis of it modulo its torsion is called a fundamental system of units. Some authors use the term fundamental unit to mean any element of a fundamental system of units, not restricting to the case of rank 1 (e.g. Neukirch 1999, p. 42).

== Real quadratic fields ==
For the real quadratic field $K=\mathbf{Q}(\sqrt{d})$ (with d square-free), the fundamental unit ε is commonly normalized so that ε > 1 (as a real number). Then it is uniquely characterized as the minimal unit among those that are greater than 1. If Δ denotes the discriminant of K, then the fundamental unit is

$$\varepsilon=\frac{a+b\sqrt{\Delta}}{2}$$

where (a, b) is the smallest solution to

$$x^2-\Delta y^2=\pm4$$

in positive integers. This equation is basically Pell's equation or the negative Pell equation and its solutions can be obtained similarly using the continued fraction expansion of $\sqrt{\Delta}$.

Whether or not x^{2} − Δy^{2} = −4 has a solution determines whether or not the class group of K is the same as its narrow class group, or equivalently, whether or not there is a unit of norm −1 in K. This equation is known to have a solution if, and only if, the period of the continued fraction expansion of $\sqrt{\Delta}$ is odd. A simpler relation can be obtained using congruences: if Δ is divisible by a prime that is congruent to 3 modulo 4, then K does not have a unit of norm −1. However, the converse does not hold as shown by the example d = 34. In the early 1990s, Peter Stevenhagen proposed a probabilistic model that led him to a conjecture on how often the converse fails. Specifically, if D(X) is the number of real quadratic fields whose discriminant Δ < X is not divisible by a prime congruent to 3 modulo 4 and D^{−}(X) is those who have a unit of norm −1, then

$$\lim_{X\rightarrow\infty}\frac{D^-(X)}{D(X)}=1-\prod_{j\geq1\text{ odd}}\left(1-2^{-j}\right).$$

In other words, the converse fails about 42% of the time. As of March 2012, a recent result towards this conjecture was provided by Étienne Fouvry and Jürgen Klüners who show that the converse fails between 33% and 59% of the time. In 2022, Peter Koymans and Carlo Pagano claimed a complete proof of Stevenhagen's conjecture.

== Cubic fields ==
If K is a complex cubic field then it has a unique real embedding and the fundamental unit ε can be picked uniquely such that |ε| > 1 in this embedding. If the discriminant Δ of K satisfies |Δ| ≥ 33, then

$$\epsilon^3>\frac{|\Delta|-27}{4}.$$

For example, the fundamental unit of $\mathbf{Q}(\sqrt[3]{2})$ is $\epsilon = 1+\sqrt[3]{2}+\sqrt[3]{2^2},$ and $\epsilon^3\approx 56.9$ whereas the discriminant of this field is −108 thus

$$\frac{|\Delta|-27}{4}=20.25$$

so $\epsilon^3 \approx 56.9 > 20.25$.
