= Stark–Heegner theorem =

Quadratic imaginary number fields with unique factorisation

In number theory, the Heegner theorem or Stark–Heegner theorem establishes the complete list of the quadratic imaginary number fields whose rings of integers are principal ideal domains. It solves a special case of Gauss's class number problem of determining the number of imaginary quadratic fields that have a given fixed class number.

Let Q denote the set of rational numbers, and let d be a square-free integer. The field $\mathbf{Q}(\sqrt{d})$ is a quadratic extension of Q. The class number of $\mathbf{Q}(\sqrt{d})$ is one if and only if the ring of integers of $\mathbf{Q}(\sqrt{d})$ is a principal ideal domain. The Baker–Heegner–Stark theorem can then be stated as follows:

If d < 0, then the class number of $\mathbf{Q}(\sqrt{d})$ is one if and only if $d \in \{\, -1, -2, -3, -7, -11, -19, -43, -67, -163\,\}.$

These are known as the Heegner numbers.

By replacing d with the discriminant D of $\mathbf{Q}(\sqrt{d})$ this list is often written as:

$$D \in\{ -3, -4, -7, -8, -11, -19, -43, -67, -163\}.$$

== History ==
This result was first conjectured by Gauss in Section 303 of his Disquisitiones Arithmeticae (1798). It was essentially proven by Kurt Heegner in 1952, but Heegner's proof was not accepted until an academic mathematician Harold Stark published a proof in 1967 which had many commonalities to Heegner's work, though Stark considers the proofs to be different. Heegner "died before anyone really understood what he had done". In (Stark 1969a) Stark works through Heegner's proof to highlight what the gap in Heegner’s proof consisted of; other contemporary papers produced various similar proofs using modular functions. (Heegner's paper dealt mainly with the congruent number problem, also using modular functions.)

Alan Baker's slightly earlier 1966 proof used completely different principles which reduced the result to a finite amount of computation, with Stark's 1963/4 thesis already providing this computation; Baker won the Fields Medal for his methods. Stark later pointed out that Baker's proof, involving linear forms in 3 logarithms, could be reduced to a statement about only 2 logarithms which was already known from 1949 by Gelfond and Linnik.

Stark's 1969 paper also cited the 1895 text by Weber and noted that if Weber had "only made the observation that the reducibility of [a certain equation] would lead to a Diophantine equation, the class-number one problem would have been solved 60 years ago". Bryan Birch notes that Weber's book, and essentially the whole field of modular functions, dropped out of interest for half a century: "Unhappily, in 1952 there was no one left who was sufficiently expert in Weber's Algebra to appreciate Heegner's achievement." Stark's 1969 paper can be seen as a good argument for calling the result Heegner's Theorem.

In the immediate years after Stark, Deuring, Siegel, and Chowla all gave slightly variant proofs by modular functions. Other versions in this genre have also cropped up over the years. For instance, in 1985, Monsur Kenku gave a proof using the Klein quartic (though again utilizing modular functions). And again, in 1999, Imin Chen gave another variant proof by modular functions (following Siegel's outline).

The work of Gross and Zagier (1986) combined with that of Goldfeld (1976) also gives an alternative proof.

== Real case ==
On the other hand, it is unknown whether there are infinitely many d > 0 for which $\mathbf{Q}(\sqrt{d})$ has class number 1. Computational results indicate that there are many such fields. Number Fields with class number one provides a list of some of these.
