= Minkowski's bound =

Limits ideals to be checked in order to determine the class number of a number field

In algebraic number theory, Minkowski's bound gives an upper bound of the norm of ideals to be checked in order to determine the class number of a number field K. It is named for the mathematician Hermann Minkowski.

== Definition ==
Let D be the discriminant of the field, n be the degree of K over $\mathbb{Q}$, and $2 r_2 = n - r_1$ be the number of complex embeddings where $r_1$ is the number of real embeddings. Then every class in the ideal class group of K contains an integral ideal of norm not exceeding Minkowski's bound

$$M_K = \sqrt{|D|} \left(\frac{4}{\pi}\right)^{r_2} \frac{n!}{n^n} \ .$$

Minkowski's constant for the field K is this bound M_{K}.

== Properties ==
Since the number of integral ideals of given norm is finite, the finiteness of the class number is an immediate consequence, and further, the ideal class group is generated by the prime ideals of norm at most M_{K}.

Minkowski's bound may be used to derive a lower bound for the discriminant of a field K given n, r_{1} and r_{2}. Since an integral ideal has norm at least one, we have 1 ≤ M_{K}, so that

$$\sqrt{|D|} \ge \left(\frac{\pi}{4}\right)^{r_2} \frac{n^n}{n!} \ge \left(\frac{\pi}{4}\right)^{n/2} \frac{n^n}{n!} \ .$$

For n at least 2, it is easy to show that the lower bound is greater than 1, so we obtain Minkowski's Theorem, that the discriminant of every number field, other than Q, is non-trivial. This implies that the field of rational numbers has no unramified extension.

== Proof ==
The result is a consequence of Minkowski's theorem.
