= Totally imaginary number field =

In algebraic number theory, a number field is called totally imaginary (or totally complex) if it cannot be embedded in the real numbers. Specific examples include imaginary quadratic fields, cyclotomic fields, and, more generally, CM fields.

Any number field that is Galois over the rationals must be either totally real or totally imaginary.
