= Class number problem =

Listing all imaginary quadratic fields with a given class number

In mathematics, the Gauss class number problem (for imaginary quadratic fields), as usually understood, is to provide for each $n\geq 1$ a complete list of imaginary quadratic fields $\mathbb{Q}(\sqrt{d})$ (for negative integers $d$) having class number $n$. It is named after Carl Friedrich Gauss. It can also be stated in terms of discriminants. There are related questions for real quadratic fields and for the behavior as $d \to -\infty$.

The difficulty is in effective computation of bounds: for a given discriminant, it is easy to compute the class number, and there are several ineffective lower bounds on class number (meaning that they involve a constant that is not computed), but effective bounds (and explicit proofs of completeness of lists) are harder.

== Gauss's original conjectures ==
The problems are posed in Gauss's Disquisitiones Arithmeticae of 1801 (section V, articles 303 and 304).

Gauss discusses imaginary quadratic fields in Article 303, stating the first two conjectures, and discusses real quadratic fields in Article 304, stating the third conjecture.

Gauss conjecture (class number tends to infinity)
$$h(d) \to \infty\text{ as }d\to -\infty.$$
Gauss class number problem (low class number lists)
For given low class number (such as 1, 2, and 3), Gauss gives lists of imaginary quadratic fields with the given class number and believes them to be complete.
Infinitely many real quadratic fields with class number one
Gauss conjectures that there are infinitely many real quadratic fields with class number one.

The original Gauss class number problem for imaginary quadratic fields is significantly different and easier than the modern statement: he restricted to even discriminants, and allowed non-fundamental discriminants.

== Status ==
Unsolved problem in mathematics
Are there infinitely many real quadratic fields with class number one?
More unsolved problems in mathematics

Gauss conjecture
Solved, Heilbronn, 1934.
Low class number lists
Class number 1: solved, Baker (1966), Stark (1967), Heegner (1952).
Class number 2: solved, Baker (1971), Stark (1971)
Class number 3: solved, Oesterlé (1985)
Class numbers h up to 100: solved, Watkins 2004
Infinitely many real quadratic fields with class number one
Open.

== Lists of discriminants of class number 1 ==
For imaginary quadratic number fields, the (fundamental) discriminants of class number 1 are:

$$d=-3,-4,-7,-8,-11,-19,-43,-67,-163.$$

The non-fundamental discriminants of class number 1 are:

$$d=-12,-16,-27,-28.$$

Thus, the even discriminants of class number 1, fundamental and non-fundamental (Gauss's original question) are:

$$d=-4,-8,-12,-16,-28.$$

== Modern developments ==
In 1934, Hans Heilbronn proved the Gauss conjecture. Equivalently, for any given class number, there are only finitely many imaginary quadratic number fields with that class number.

Also in 1934, Heilbronn and Edward Linfoot showed that there were at most 10 imaginary quadratic number fields with class number 1 (the 9 known ones, and at most one further). The result was ineffective (see effective results in number theory): it did not give bounds on the size of the remaining field.

In later developments, the case $n=1$ was first discussed by Kurt Heegner, using modular forms and modular equations to show that no further such field could exist. This work was not initially accepted; only with later work of Harold Stark and Bryan Birch (e.g. on the Stark–Heegner theorem and Heegner number) was the position clarified and Heegner's work understood. Practically simultaneously, Alan Baker proved what we now know as Baker's theorem on linear forms in logarithms of algebraic numbers, which resolved the problem by a completely different method. The case $n=2$ was tackled shortly afterwards, at least in principle, as an application of Baker's work.

The complete list of imaginary quadratic fields with class number 1 is $\mathbf{Q}(\sqrt{d})$ where d is one of

$$-1, -2, -3, -7, -11, -19, -43, -67, -163.$$

The general case awaited the discovery of Dorian Goldfeld in 1976 that the class number problem could be connected to the L-functions of elliptic curves. This effectively reduced the question of effective determination to one about establishing the existence of a multiple zero of such an L-function. With the proof of the Gross–Zagier theorem in 1986, a complete list of imaginary quadratic fields with a given class number could be specified by a finite calculation. All cases up to $n=100$ were computed by Watkins in 2004. The class number of $\mathbf{Q}(\sqrt{-d})$ for $d=1,2,3,\dots$ is

$1, 1, 1, 1, 2, 2, 1, 1, 1, 2, 1, 1, 2, 4, 2, 1, 4, 1, 1, 2, 4, 2, 3, 2, 1, 6, 1, 1, 6, 4, 3, 1, ...$ (sequence A202084 in the OEIS).

== Real quadratic fields ==
The contrasting case of real quadratic fields is very different, and much less is known. That is because what enters the analytic formula for the class number is not $h$, the class number, on its own—but $h\log \varepsilon$, where $\varepsilon$ is a fundamental unit. This extra factor is hard to control. It may well be the case that class number 1 for real quadratic fields occurs infinitely often.

The Cohen–Lenstra heuristics are a set of more precise conjectures about the structure of class groups of quadratic fields. For real fields, they predict that about 75.45% of the fields obtained by adjoining the square root of a prime will have class number 1, a result that agrees with computations.

== See also ==
- List of number fields with class number one
