= Narrow class group =

In algebraic number theory, the narrow class group of a number field K is a refinement of the class group of K that takes into account some information about embeddings of K into the field of real numbers.

== Formal definition ==
Suppose that K is a finite extension of Q. Recall that the ordinary class group of K is defined as the quotient

$$C_K = I_K / P_K,\,$$

where I_{K} is the group of fractional ideals of K, and P_{K} is the subgroup of principal fractional ideals of K, that is, ideals of the form aO_{K} where a is an element of K.

The narrow class group is defined to be the quotient

$$C_K^+ = I_K / P_K^+,$$

where now P_{K}^{+} is the group of totally positive principal fractional ideals of K; that is, ideals of the form aO_{K} where a is an element of K such that σ(a) is positive for every embedding

$$\sigma : K \to \mathbb{R}.$$

== Uses ==
The narrow class group features prominently in the theory of representing integers by quadratic forms. An example is the following result (Fröhlich and Taylor, Chapter V, Theorem 1.25).

Theorem. Suppose that $K = \mathbb{Q}(\sqrt{d}\,),$ where d is a square-free integer, and that the narrow class group of K is trivial. Suppose that

$$\{ \omega_1, \omega_2 \}\,\!$$

is a basis for the ring of integers of K. Define a quadratic form

$$q_K(x,y) = N_{K/\mathbb{Q}}(\omega_1 x + \omega_2 y)$$,

where N_{K/Q} is the norm. Then a prime number p is of the form

$$p = q_K(x,y)\,$$

for some integers x and y if and only if either

$$p \mid d_K\,\!,$$

or

$$p = 2 \quad \mbox{ and } \quad d_K \equiv 1 \pmod 8,$$

or

$$p > 2 \quad \mbox{ and} \quad \left(\frac {d_K} p\right) = 1,$$

where d_{K} is the discriminant of K, and

$$\left(\frac ab\right)$$

denotes the Legendre symbol.

=== Examples ===
For example, one can prove that the quadratic fields Q(√−1), Q(√2), Q(√−3) all have trivial narrow class group. Then, by choosing appropriate bases for the integers of each of these fields, the above theorem implies the following:

- A prime p is of the form p = x^{2} + y^{2} for integers x and y if and only if

$$p = 2 \quad \mbox{or} \quad p \equiv 1 \pmod 4.$$

(This is known as Fermat's theorem on sums of two squares.)

- A prime p is of the form p = x^{2} − 2y^{2} for integers x and y if and only if

$$p = 2 \quad \mbox{or} \quad p \equiv 1, 7 \pmod 8.$$

- A prime p is of the form p = x^{2} − xy + y^{2} for integers x and y if and only if

$p = 3 \quad \mbox{or} \quad p \equiv 1 \pmod 3.$ (cf. Eisenstein prime)

An example that illustrates the difference between the narrow class group and the usual class group is the case of Q(√6). This has trivial class group, but its narrow class group has order 2. Because the class group is trivial, the following statement is true:

- A prime p or its inverse −p is of the form ± p = x^{2} − 6y^{2} for integers x and y if and only if

$$p = 2 \quad \mbox{or} \quad p = 3 \quad \mbox{or} \quad \left(\frac{6}{p}\right)=1.$$

However, this statement is false if we focus only on p and not −p (and is in fact even false for p = 2), because the narrow class group is nontrivial. The statement that classifies the positive p is the following:

- A prime p is of the form p = x^{2} − 6y^{2} for integers x and y if and only if p = 3 or

$$\left(\frac{6}{p}\right)=1 \quad \mbox{and}\quad \left(\frac{-2}{p}\right)=1.$$

(Whereas the first statement allows primes $p \equiv 1, 5, 19, 23 \pmod {24}$, the second only allows primes $p \equiv 1, 19 \pmod {24}$.)

== See also ==
- Class group
- Quadratic form
