= Kurt Heegner =

German mathematician

Kurt Heegner (German: [ˈheːɡnɐ]; 16 December 1893 – 2 February 1965) was a German private scholar from Berlin, who specialized in radio engineering and mathematics. He is famous for his mathematical discoveries in number theory and, in particular, the Stark–Heegner theorem.

== Life and career ==
Heegner was born in Berlin and died there.

In 1952, he published a solution to the class number 1 problem, a classic number theory problem proposed by Gauss. For years, Heegner's work was not accepted, mainly due to his quoting of a portion of Heinrich Martin Weber's work that was known to be incorrect (though Heegner never used this result in the proof). The first solution to the class number 1 problem to be broadly accepted by the mathematical community was the 1967 solution by Harold Stark, but then Bryan Birch, Max Deuring, and Stark all noticed that Heegner's solution was essentially correct, and each of them explained how to fill in the details. (Stark disagrees with the commonly held notion that his proof is "more or less the same" as Heegner's.)

The result is now often called the Stark–Heegner theorem.

== See also ==
- List of amateur mathematicians
- Stark–Heegner theorem
- Heegner number
- Heegner point
- Heegner's lemma

== Literature ==
- Heegner, Kurt (1952), "Diophantische Analysis und Modulfunktionen", Mathematische Zeitschrift, 56 (3): 227–253, doi:10.1007/BF01174749, MR 0053135, S2CID 120109035
- Stark, H.M. (1969). "On the "Gap" in a Theorem of Heegner" (PDF). Journal of Number Theory. 1 (1): 16–27. Bibcode:1969JNT.....1...16S. doi:10.1016/0022-314x(69)90023-7. hdl:2027.42/33039.
