= Selberg class =

Axiomatic definition of a class of L-functions

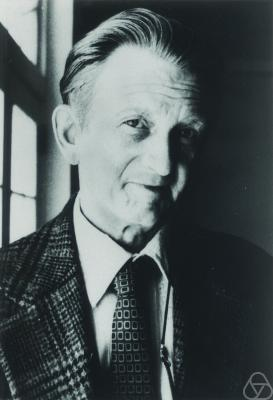
Atle Selberg

In mathematics, the Selberg class is an axiomatic definition of a class of L-functions. The members of the class are Dirichlet series which obey four axioms that seem to capture the essential properties satisfied by most functions that are commonly called L-functions or zeta functions. Although the exact nature of the class is conjectural, the hope is that the definition of the class will lead to a classification of its contents and an elucidation of its properties, including insight into their relationship to automorphic forms and the Riemann hypothesis. The class was defined by Atle Selberg in (Selberg 1992), who preferred not to use the word "axiom" that later authors have employed.

== Definition ==
The formal definition of the class S is the set of all Dirichlet series

$$F(s)=\sum_{n=1}^\infty \frac{a_n}{n^s}$$

absolutely convergent for Re(s) > 1 that satisfy four axioms (or assumptions as Selberg calls them):

1. Analyticity: $F(s)$ has a meromorphic continuation to the entire complex plane, with the only possible pole (if any) when s = 1.
2. Ramanujan conjecture: $a_1 = 1$ and $a_n = O(n^\varepsilon)$ for any ε > 0;
3. Functional equation: there is a gamma factor of the form
  $$\gamma(s)=Q^s\prod_{i=1}^k \Gamma (\omega_is+\mu_i)$$
  where Q is real and positive, Γ the gamma function, the ω_{i} real and positive, and the μ_{i} complex with non-negative real part, as well as a so-called root number
  $$\alpha\in\mathbb C,\;|\alpha|=1$$,
  such that the function
  $$\Phi(s) = \gamma(s) F(s)\,$$
  satisfies
  $$\Phi(s)=\alpha\,\overline{\Phi(1-\overline{s})};$$
4. Euler product: For Re(s) > 1, F(s) can be written as a product over primes:
  $$F(s)=\prod_p F_p(s)$$
  with
  $$F_p(s)=\exp\left(\sum_{n=1}^\infty\frac{b_{p^n}}{p^{ns}}\right)$$
  and, for some θ < 1/2,
  $$b_{p^n}=O(p^{n\theta}).\,$$

=== Comments on definition ===
- Without the condition $a_n = O(n^\varepsilon)$, the class would contain

$$L(s+1/3,\chi_4)L(s-1/3,\chi_4),$$

which violates the Riemann hypothesis.

- Without this functional equation, the class would have Dirichlet L-functions for any imprimitive character. If $\chi$ is a Dirichlet character induced by $\chi^\star$, then we have

$$L(s,\chi) = L(s,\chi^\star) \prod_{p \,|\, q}\left(1 - \chi^\star(p) p^{-s} \right).$$

Despite this, the function satisfies the other three axiom; from those additional factors, it follows that it has infinitely many zeros on $\operatorname{Re}(s)=0$. They are not symmetric with respect to $\operatorname{Re}(s)=\tfrac{1}{2}$, and without the functional equation proposed by Selberg, it is hard to distinguish between trivial and nontrivial zeros of this function.

- If the function F satisfies a functional equation with different gamma factors, then using Stirling's formula for the gamma function one can show that

$$\gamma_2(s) = C \cdot \gamma_1(s)$$

for some real number $C$. However, by the multiplication formula, the same gamma factor can be expressed in many different ways, involving different numbers of gamma functions with different constants. Despite this, Selberg proved that the sum $\sum_{i=1}^k\omega_i$ is independent of the choice of the gamma factor formula.

- The condition that the real part of μ_{i} be non-negative is because there are known L-functions that do not satisfy the Riemann hypothesis when μ_{i} is negative. Specifically, there are Maass forms associated with exceptional eigenvalues, for which the Ramanujan–Petersson conjecture holds, and which have a functional equation, but do not satisfy the Riemann hypothesis.
- Having an Euler product is essential, as demonstrated by a notable counterexample given by Davenport and Heilbronn:

$$F(s) = \frac{1-\alpha i}{2}L(s,\chi_5) + \frac{1+\alpha i}{2}L(s,\overline{\chi}_5) \quad \text{where } \alpha = \frac{\sqrt{10-\sqrt{5}}-2}{\sqrt{5}-1}.$$

Despite having an analytic continuation, having periodic coefficients (thus satisfying the Ramanujan conjecture), and satisfying the functional equation, it has zeros lying off the critical line.

== Properties ==
The Selberg class is closed under multiplication: the product of any two functions belonging to S are also in S. It is also easy to check that, if F is in S, then the function

$$\overline{F(\overline{s})} = \sum_{n=1}^{\infty}\frac{\overline{a_n}}{n^{s}}$$

is also in S. If F is an entire function in S, then $F(s + it)$ for $t \in \mathbb{R}$ is also in S.

From the Ramanujan conjecture, it follows that if

$$\sum_{i=1}^{n}\vert a_i\vert = O(n^{1+\epsilon})$$

for every $\epsilon > 0$, then the corresponding Dirichlet series is absolutely convergent in the half-plane $\operatorname{Re}(s) >1$.

Despite the unusual version of the Euler product in the axioms, by exponentiation of Dirichlet series, one can deduce that a_{n} is a multiplicative sequence and that

$$F_p(s)=\sum_{n=0}^\infty\frac{a_{p^n}}{p^{ns}}$$

for Re(s) > 1. From $\theta < \tfrac{1}{2}$, it follows that each factor

$$\log F_p = \sum_{n=1}^\infty \frac{b_{p^n}}{p^{ns}}$$

of the Euler product is absolutely convergent in $\operatorname{Re}(s)>\tfrac{1}{2}$. Then $F_p(s)$ is absolutely convergent and $F_p(s) \neq 0$ in this region. In the half-plane of absolute convergence of the original Dirichlet series, the function is an absolutely convergent product of non-vanishing factors, so for functions in the Selberg class, $F(s)\neq 0$ in $\operatorname{Re}(s)>1$.

From the functional equation, it follows that every pole of the gamma factor γ(s) in $\text{Re}(s) < 0$ must be cancelled by a zero of F. Such zeros are called trivial zeros; the other zeros of F are called non-trivial zeros. All nontrivial zeros are located in the critical strip, $0 < \text{Re}(s) < 1$, and by the functional equation, the nontrivial zeros are symmetric about the critical line, $\text{Re}(s) = \frac{1}{2}$.

The non-negative real number

$$d_F=2\sum_{i=1}^k\omega_i$$

is called the degree (or dimension) of F. Since this sum is independent of the choice of functional equation, it is well-defined for any function F. If F and G are in the Selberg class, then the degree of their product is

$$d_{FG}=d_F+d_G.$$

It can be shown that F = 1 is the only function in S whose degree is $d_F<1$. Kaczorowski & Perelli (2011) showed that the only cases of $d_F < 2$ are the Dirichlet L-functions for primitive Dirichlet characters (including the Riemann zeta-function). Denoting the number of non-trivial zeros of F with 0 ≤ Im(s) ≤ T by N_{F}(T), Selberg showed that

$$N_F(T)=d_F\frac{T\log(T+C)}{2\pi}+O(\log T).$$

An explicit version of the result was proven by Palojärvi (2019).

It was proven by Kaczorowski & Perelli (2003) that for F in the Selberg class, $F(1+it)\neq 0$ for $t\in \mathbb{R}$ is equivalent to

$$\lim_{x\rightarrow \infty}\frac{\sum_{p\leq x}\vert a_p\vert^2}{\pi(x)} = \kappa_F,$$

where $\kappa_F > 0$ is a real number and $\pi$ is the prime-counting function. This result can be thought of as a generalization of the prime number theorem. Nagoshi & Steuding (2010) showed that functions satisfying the prime-number-theorem condition have a universality property for the strip $\sigma < Re(s) < 1$, where $\sigma = \max \lbrace \frac{1}{2},1-\frac{1}{d_F} \rbrace$. It generalizes the universality property of the Riemann zeta function and Dirichlet L-functions.

A function $F \neq 1$ in S is called primitive if, whenever it is written as $F = F_1 \cdot F_2$, with both of function in Selberg class, then $F = F_1$ or $F = F_2$. As a consequence of the facts that degree is additive with respect to multiplication of functions and the only function of degree $d_F < 1$ is $F = 1$, every function F ≠ 1 can be written as a product of primitive functions. However, uniqueness of this factorization is still unproven.

== Examples ==
The prototypical example of an element in S is the Riemann zeta function. Also, most of generalizations of the zeta function, like Dirichlet L-functions and Dedekind zeta functions, belong to the Selberg class.

Examples of primitive functions include the Riemann zeta function and Dirichlet L-functions of primitive Dirichlet characters or some Artin L-functions for irreducible representations of Galois groups of Galois extensions of $\mathbb{Q}$ (in the general case of Artin L-function, the non-existence of poles violating the analyticity axiom is the subject of the Artin conjecture).

Another example is the L-function of the modular discriminant Δ,

$$L(s,\Delta)=\sum_{n=1}^\infty\frac{\tau(n)/n^{11/2}}{n^s},$$

where $\tau(n)$ is the Ramanujan tau function. This example can be considered a "normalized" or "shifted" L-function for the original Ramanujan L-function, defined as

$$L(s)=\sum_{n=1}^\infty\frac{\tau(n)}{n^s},$$

whose coefficients satisfy $\vert \tau(n)\vert \leq n^{\frac{11}{2}}$. It has the functional equation

$$( \frac{1}{2\pi} )^s\Gamma (s)L(s)=
(\frac{1}{2\pi})^{12-s}\Gamma(12-s)L(12-s)$$

and is expected to have all nontrivial zeros on the line $\operatorname{Re}(s)=6$.

All known examples are automorphic L-functions, and the reciprocals of F_{p}(s) are polynomials in p^{−s} of bounded degree.

== Conjectures ==
=== Selberg's conjectures ===
In (Selberg 1992), Selberg made conjectures concerning the functions in S:

- Conjecture 1: For all F in S, there is an integer n_{F} such that
  $$\sum_{p\leq x}\frac{|a_p|^2}{p}=n_F\log\log x+O(1)$$
  and n_{F} = 1 whenever F is primitive.
- Conjecture 2: For distinct primitive F,F′ ∈ S,
  $$\sum_{p\leq x} \frac{a_p\overline{a_p^\prime}}{p}=O(1).$$
- Conjecture 3: If F is in S with primitive factorization
  $$F = \prod_{i=1}^m F_i,$$
  χ is a primitive Dirichlet character, and the function
  $$F^\chi(s) = \sum_{n=1}^\infty\frac{\chi(n)a_n}{n^s}$$
  is also in S, then the functions F_{i}^{χ} are primitive elements of S (and consequently, they form the primitive factorization of F^{χ}).
- Generalized Riemann hypothesis for S: For all F in S, the non-trivial zeros of F all lie on the line Re(s) = 1/2.

The first two Selberg conjectures are often collectively called the Selberg orthogonality conjecture.

=== Other conjectures ===
It is conjectured that the Selberg class is equal to the class of automorphic L-functions. Primitive functions are expected to be associated with irreducible automorphic representations.

It is conjectured that all reciprocals of factors F_{p}(s) of the Euler products are polynomials in p^{−s} of bounded degree.

It is conjectured that, for any F in the Selberg class, $d_F$ is a nonnegative integer. The best particular result due to Kaczorowski & Perelli shows this only for $d_F<2$.

=== Consequences of the conjectures ===
The Selberg orthogonality conjecture has numerous consequences for functions in the Selberg class:

- The factorization of F in S into primitive functions would be unique.
- If $F = F_1^{e_1}\dots F_n^{e_n}$ is a factorization of F in S into primitive functions, then $n_F = e_1^2 + \dots + e_n^2$. In particular, this implies that $n_F=1$ if and only if F is a primitive function.
- The functions in S have no zeros on $Re(s)=1$. This implies that they satisfy a generalization of the prime number theorem and have a universality property.
- If F has a pole of order m at s = 1, then F(s)/ζ(s)^{m} is entire. In particular, they imply Dedekind's conjecture.
- M. Ram Murty showed in (Murty 1994) that the orthogonality conjecture implies the Artin conjecture.
- In the same article, Murty proved that the orthogonality conjecture implies Langlands reciprocity for Artin L-functions of solvable extensions.
- L-functions of irreducible cuspidal automorphic representations that satisfy the Ramanujan conjecture are primitive.

The generalized Riemann hypothesis for S implies many different generalizations of the original Riemann hypothesis, the most notable being the generalized Riemann hypothesis for Dirichlet L-functions and extended Riemann hypothesis for Dedekind zeta functions, with multiple consequences in analytic number theory, algebraic number theory, class field theory, and numerous branches of mathematics.

Combined with the generalized Riemann hypothesis, different versions of the orthogonality conjecture imply certain growth rates for the function and its logarithmic derivative.

If the Selberg class equals the class of automorphic L-functions, then the Riemann hypothesis for S would be equivalent to the grand Riemann hypothesis.

== See also ==
- List of zeta functions
