= Deuring–Heilbronn phenomenon =

In mathematics, the Deuring–Heilbronn phenomenon, discovered by Max Deuring (1933) and Hans Heilbronn (1934), states that a counterexample to the generalized Riemann hypothesis for one Dirichlet L-function affects the location of the zeros of other Dirichlet L-functions.

== See also ==
- Siegel zero
