= Siegel zero =

Potential counterexample to the generalized Riemann hypothesis

In mathematics, more specifically in the field of analytic number theory, a Landau–Siegel zero or simply Siegel zero, also known as an exceptional zero, named after Edmund Landau and Carl Ludwig Siegel, was a type of potential counterexample to the generalized Riemann hypothesis, on the zeros of Dirichlet L-functions associated to quadratic number fields. Roughly speaking, these would be possible zeros very near (in a quantifiable sense) to $s=1$.

In 2026, OpenAI released a large number of manuscripts which included a claimed AI-generated proof of the non-existence of Siegel zeros, in more than one way, and in terms that could be understood on an undergraduate course in mathematics despite the problem being "the bane of analytic number theory for over a hundred years"; these arguments have since been simplified and restated by, among others, William Banks, Bryce Kerr, Ben Green, and Terence Tao.

== Motivation and definition ==
The way in which Siegel zeros appear in the theory of Dirichlet L-functions is as postulated exceptions to the classical zero-free regions, which can only occur when the L-function is associated to a real Dirichlet character.

=== Real primitive Dirichlet characters ===
For an integer q ≥ 1, a Dirichlet character modulo q is an arithmetic function $\chi\colon \mathbb{Z}\to\mathbb{C}$ satisfying the following properties:

- Completely multiplicative: $\chi(mn) = \chi(m)\chi(n)$ for every m, n;
- Periodic: $\chi(n+q) = \chi(n)$ for every n;
- Support: $\chi(n) = 0$ if and only if $\mathrm{gcd}(n,q) > 1$.

That is, χ is the lifting of a homomorphism $\widetilde{\chi}:(\mathbb{Z}/q\mathbb{Z})^{\times} \to \mathbb{C}^{*}$.

The trivial character is the character modulo 1, and the principal character modulo q, denoted $\chi_0~(\mathrm{mod}~q)$, is the lifting of the trivial homomorphism $(\mathbb{Z}/q\mathbb{Z})^{\times}\ni a \mapsto 1 \in \mathbb{C}^{*}$.

A character $\chi~(\mathrm{mod}~{q})$ is called imprimitive if there exists some integer $d\neq q$ with $d\mid q$ such that the induced homomorphism $\widetilde{\chi}\colon (\mathbb{Z}/q\mathbb{Z})^{\times} \to \mathbb{C}^{*}$ factors as

$$(\mathbb{Z}/q\mathbb{Z})^{\times}\twoheadrightarrow (\mathbb{Z}/d\mathbb{Z})^{\times} \xrightarrow{\widetilde{\chi'}} \mathbb{C}^{*}$$

for some character $\chi'~(\mathrm{mod}~{d})$; otherwise, $\chi~(\mathrm{mod}~{q})$ is called primitive.

A character $\chi$ is real (or quadratic) if it equals its complex conjugate $\overline{\chi}$ (defined as $\overline{\chi}(n) := \overline{\chi(n)}$), or equivalently if $\chi^2 = \chi_0$. The real primitive Dirichlet characters are in one-to-one correspondence with the Kronecker symbols $(D|\,\cdot\,): \mathbb{Z} \to \{-1,0,1\}$ for $D\in\mathbb{Z}$ a fundamental discriminant (i.e., the discriminant of a quadratic number field). One way to define $(D|\,\cdot\,)$ is as the completely multiplicative arithmetic function determined by (for p prime):

$$\bigg(\frac{D}{p}\bigg)=\begin{cases}1, &(p)\text{ splits in } \mathbb{Q}(\sqrt{D}), \\ -1, &(p)\text{ is inert } \cdots, \\ 0, &(p)\text{ ramifies } \cdots, \end{cases} \quad \bigg(\frac{D}{-1}\bigg) = \text{sign of } D.$$

It is thus common to write $\chi_D := (D|\,\cdot\,)$, which are real primitive characters modulo $|D|$.

=== Dirichlet L-functions ===
The Dirichlet L-function associated with a character $\chi~(\mathrm{mod}~q)$ is defined as the analytic continuation of the Dirichlet series:

$$L(s,\chi) = \sum_{n=1}^{\infty} \chi(n) n^{-s}$$

defined for $\mathrm{Re}(s)>1$, where s is a complex variable. For a non-principal Dirichlet character this continuation is an entire function, otherwise it has only one simple pole with residue:

$$\prod_{p\mid q}(1-p^{-1})$$

at s = 1 as its only singularity. Because Dirichlet characters are multiplicative functions, for $\mathrm{Re}(s)>1$ their Dirichlet L-functions can be expanded into an Euler product:

$$L(s,\chi) = \prod_{p} (1 - \chi(p)p^{-s})^{-1}$$.

Since this Euler product is an absolutely convergent product of non-vanishing factors, we can deduce that Dirichlet L-functions have no zeros in the half-plane $\mathrm{Re}(s)>1$. Because the analytic continuation satisfies a certain functional equation, we can conclude that the only zeros of a Dirichlet L-function in $\mathrm{Re}(s)<0$ would be simple zeros that cancel the poles of the gamma factor in that equation. If $\chi$ is a non-principal even character, this includes also the point $s=0$ which lies on the boundary of this region. These zeros are called trivial zeros of a Dirichlet L-function. Any other zeros are called nontrivial zeros.

=== Classical zero-free regions ===
The classical theorem on zero-free regions Grönwall (1913), Landau (1918) and Titchmarsh (1930) states that there exists an effectively computable real number $A>0$ such that, writing $s=\sigma + it$ for the complex variable, the function $L(s,\chi)$ has no zeros in the region:

$$\sigma > 1 - \frac{A}{\log q + \log (|t|+2)}$$

if $\chi~(\mathrm{mod}~q)$ is non-real. If $\chi$ is real, then there is at most one zero in this region, which must necessarily be real and simple. This possible zero is the so-called Siegel zero.

The generalized Riemann hypothesis (GRH) claims that for every $\chi~(\mathrm{mod}~q)$, all the non-trivial zeros of $L(s,\chi)$ lie on the line $\mathrm{Re}(s)=\frac{1}{2}$.

=== Defining "Siegel zeros" ===
The definition of Siegel zeros as presented ties it to the constant A in the zero-free region. This often makes it tricky to deal with these objects, since in many situations the particular value of the constant A is of little concern. Hence, it is usual to work with more definite statements, either asserting or denying, the existence of an infinite family of such zeros, such as in:

- Conjecture ("no Siegel zeros"): If $\beta_D$ denotes the largest real zero of $L(s,\chi_D)$, then $1-\beta_D \gg \frac{1}{\log|D|}.$

The possibility of existence or non-existence of Siegel zeros has a large impact in closely related subjects of number theory, with the "no Siegel zeros" conjecture serving as a weaker (although powerful, and sometimes fully sufficient) substitute for GRH (see below for an example involving Siegel–Tatsuzawa's Theorem and the idoneal number problem). An equivalent formulation of "no Siegel zeros" that does not reference zeros explicitly is the statement:

$$\frac{L'}{L}(1,\chi_D) = O(\log|D|).$$

The equivalence can be deduced for example by using the zero-free regions and classical estimates for the number of non-trivial zeros of $L(s,\chi)$ up to a certain height.

== Landau–Siegel estimates ==
The first breakthrough in dealing with these zeros came from Landau, who showed that there exists an effectively computable constant $B>0$ such that, for any $\chi_D$ and $\chi_{D'}$ real primitive characters to distinct moduli, if $\beta, \beta'$ are real zeros of $L(s,\chi_D), L(s,\chi_{D'})$ respectively, then

$$\min\{\beta,\beta'\} < 1- \frac{B}{\log|DD'|}.$$

This is saying that, if Siegel zeros exist, then they cannot be too numerous. The way this is proved is via a 'twisting' argument, which lifts the problem to the Dedekind zeta function of the biquadratic field $\mathbb{Q}(\sqrt{D},\sqrt{D'})$. This technique is still largely applied in modern works.

This 'repelling effect' (see Deuring–Heilbronn phenomenon), after more careful analysis, led Landau to his 1936 theorem, which states that for every $\varepsilon > 0$, there is $C(\varepsilon)\in\mathbb{R}_{+}$ such that, if $\beta$ is a real zero of $L(s,\chi_D)$, then:

$$\beta < 1 - C(\varepsilon)|D|^{-\frac{3}{8} - \varepsilon}$$.

However, in the same year, in the same issue of the same journal, Siegel directly improved this estimate to:

$$\beta < 1 - C(\varepsilon)|D|^{-\varepsilon}.$$

Both Landau's and Siegel's proofs provide no explicit way to calculate $C(\varepsilon)\in\mathbb{R}_{+}$, thus being instances of an ineffective result.

=== Siegel–Tatsuzawa theorem ===
In 1951, Tikao Tatsuzawa proved an 'almost' effective version of Siegel's theorem, showing that for any fixed $0 < \varepsilon < \frac{1}{11.2}$, if $|D| > e^{1/\varepsilon}$ then

$$L(1,\chi_D) > 0.655\varepsilon|D|^{-\varepsilon},$$

with the possible exception of at most one fundamental discriminant. Using the 'almost effectivity' of this result, P. J. Weinberger (1973) showed that Euler's list of 65 idoneal numbers is complete except for at most two elements.

== Relation to quadratic fields ==
Siegel zeros often appear as more than an artificial issue in the argument for deducing zero-free regions, since zero-free region estimates enjoy deep connections to the arithmetic of quadratic fields. For instance, the identity $\zeta_{\mathbb{Q}(\sqrt{D})}(s) = \zeta(s) L(s,\chi_D)$ can be interpreted as an analytic formulation of quadratic reciprocity (see Artin reciprocity law §Statement in terms of L-functions). The precise relation between the distribution of zeros near s = 1 and arithmetic comes from Dirichlet's class number formula:

$$L(1,\chi_D) =
\begin{cases} \dfrac{2 \pi}{w_D \sqrt{|D|}}  \, h(D), &\text{if } D < 0 \\[.5em]
\dfrac{\log\varepsilon_D}{\sqrt{D}}\, h(D), &\text{if } D > 0,
\end{cases}$$

where:

- $h(D)$ is the ideal class number of $\mathbb{Q}(\sqrt{D})$;
- $w_D$ is the number of roots of unity in $\mathbb{Q}(\sqrt{D})$ (D < 0);
- $\varepsilon_D$ is the fundamental unit of $\mathbb{Q}(\sqrt{D})$ (D > 0).

This way, estimates for the largest real zero of $L(s,\chi_D)$ can be translated into estimates for $L(1,\chi_D)$ (via, for example, the fact that $|L'(\sigma,\chi)| = O(\log^2 q)$ for $1-\frac{1}{\log q} \leq \sigma \leq 1$), which in turn become estimates for $h(D)$. Classical works in the subject treat these three quantities essentially interchangeably, although the case D > 0 brings additional complications related to the fundamental unit.

=== Siegel zeros as 'quadratic phenomena' ===
There is a sense in which the difficulty associated to the phenomenon of Siegel zeros in general is entirely restricted to quadratic extensions. It is a consequence of the Kronecker–Weber theorem, for example, that the Dedekind zeta function $\zeta_{K}(s) = \sum_{I\subseteq \mathfrak{O}_K} [\mathfrak{O}_K: I]^{-s}$ of an abelian number field $K/\mathbb{Q}$ can be written as a product of Dirichlet L-functions. Thus, if $\zeta_{K}(s)$ has a Siegel zero, there must be some subfield $F\subseteq K$ with $[F:\mathbb{Q}] = 2$ such that $\zeta_{F}(s)$ has a Siegel zero.

While for the non-abelian case $\zeta_{K}(s)$ can only be factored into more complicated Artin L-functions, the same is true:

- Theorem (Stark, 1974). Let $K/\mathbb{Q}$ be a number field of degree n > 1. There is a constant $c(n)$ ($= 4$ if $K/\mathbb{Q}$ is normal, $= 4n!$ otherwise) such that, if there is a real $\beta$ in the range

$$1 - \frac{c(n)}{\log|\Delta_K|} \leq \beta < 1$$
with $\zeta_K(\beta) = 0$, then there is a quadratic subfield $F\subseteq K$ such that $\zeta_{F}(\beta)=0$. Here, $\Delta_K$ is the field discriminant of the extension $K/\mathbb{Q}$.

== "No Siegel zeros" for D < 0 ==
When dealing with quadratic fields, the case $D>0$ tends to be elusive due to the behaviour of the fundamental unit. Thus, it is common to treat the cases $D<0$ and $D>0$ separately. Much more is known for the negative discriminant case:

=== Lower bounds for h(D) ===
According to Landau (1918), Erich Hecke showed that "no Siegel zeros" for $D<0$ implies that (see Class number problem for comparison):

$$h(D) \gg \frac{\sqrt{|D|}}{\log|D|}$$

This can be extended to an equivalence, as it is a consequence of Theorem 3 in Granville–Stark (2000):

$$\text{“No Siegel zeros” for } D<0 \quad\iff\quad h(D) \gg \frac{\sqrt{|D|}}{\log|D|}\sum_{(a,b,c)} \frac{1}{a},$$

where the summation runs over the reduced binary quadratic forms $ax^2 + bxy + cy^2$ of discriminant $D$. Using this, Granville and Stark showed that a certain uniform formulation of the abc conjecture for number fields implies "no Siegel zeros" for negative discriminants.

In 1976, Dorian Goldfeld proved the following unconditional, effective lower bound for $h(D)$:

$$h(D) \gg \prod_{p\mid D} \bigg(1-\frac{2\sqrt{p}}{p+1}\bigg)\, \log|D|.$$

=== Complex multiplication ===
Another equivalence for "no Siegel zeros" for $D<0$ can be given in terms of upper bounds for heights of singular moduli:

$$h(j(\tau_D)) \ll \log|D|,$$

where:

- $h$ is the absolute logarithmic naïve height for number fields;
- $j$ is the j-invariant function;
- $\tau_D := (D+\sqrt{D})/2$.

The number $j(\tau_D)$ generates the Hilbert class field of $\mathbb{Q}(\sqrt{D})$, which is its maximal unramified abelian extension. This equivalence is a direct consequence of the results in Granville–Stark (2000), and can be seen in C. Táfula (2019).

A precise relation between heights and values of L-functions was obtained by Pierre Colmez (1993, 1998), who showed that, for an elliptic curve $E_D/\mathbb{C}$ with complex multiplication by $\mathbb{Z}[\tau_D]$, we have

$$-2 h_{\mathrm{Fal}}(E_D) - \frac{1}{2} \log|D| = \frac{L'}{L}(0,\chi_D) + \log 2\pi,$$

where $h_{\mathrm{Fal}}$ denotes the Faltings height. Using the identities $h_{\mathrm{Fal}}(E_D) = \frac{1}{12}h(j(\tau_D)) + O(\log h(j(\tau_D)))$ and $\frac{L'}{L}(1,\chi_D) = -\frac{L'}{L}(0,\chi_D) - \log|D| + \log 2\pi + \gamma$, Colmez' theorem also provides a proof for the equivalence above.

== Consequences of Siegel zeros existing ==
Although the generalized Riemann hypothesis is expected to be true, since the "no Siegel zeros" conjecture was open for many decades, it is interesting to study what consequences such severe counterexamples to the GRH would imply. Another reason to study this possibility is that the proof of certain unconditional theorems require the division into two cases: first a proof assuming no Siegel zeros exist, then another assuming Siegel zeros do exist. A classical theorem of this type is Linnik's theorem on the smallest prime in an arithmetic progression.

The following are some examples of facts that follow from the existence of Siegel zeros.

=== Infinitude of twin primes ===
A striking result in this direction is Roger Heath-Brown's 1983 result which, following Terence Tao, can be stated as follows:

- Theorem (Heath-Brown, 1983). At least one of the following is true: (1) There are no Siegel zeros. (2) There are infinitely many twin primes.

=== Parity problem ===
The parity problem in sieve theory roughly refers to the fact that sieving arguments are, generally speaking, unable to tell if an integer has an even or odd number of prime divisors. This leads to many upper bounds in sieve estimates, such as the one from the linear sieve being off by a factor of 2 from the expected value. In 2020, Granville showed that under the assumption of the existence of Siegel zeros, the general upper bounds for the problem of sieving intervals are optimal, meaning that the extra factor of 2 coming from the parity phenomenon would thus not be an artificial limitation of the method.

== See also ==
- Generalized Riemann hypothesis
- Deuring–Heilbronn phenomenon
- Class number problem
- Brauer–Siegel theorem
- Siegel–Walfisz theorem
