= Partial Euler Product =

Mathematical concept in number theory

A partial Euler product is a finite truncation of an Euler product, obtained by restricting the product to primes up to a specified bound. For the Riemann zeta function, it takes the form

$$P(s,x)=\prod_{p\le x}\left(1-\frac1{p^s}\right)^{-1},$$

where the product is over primes $p\le x$. As $x$ increases, the partial product approaches the full Euler product in its region of convergence. Analogous partial products can be formed for Dirichlet L-functions and other Dirichlet series with Euler products. Taking logarithms of partial Euler products expresses them as sums over prime powers and allows their asymptotic behaviour to be studied.

A classical result concerning partial Euler products is Mertens' third theorem, which gives an asymptotic formula for the product over primes of $(1-1/p)^{-1}$. Partial Euler products also arise in the study of elliptic curve L-functions, including work related to the Birch and Swinnerton-Dyer conjecture and the Riemann hypothesis for such L-functions.

== Overview ==
In a branch of mathematics called analytic number theory, numbers such as prime numbers are studied using "smooth" (continuous) tools from other areas. One of those tools are Euler Products; in short, if you have a sum like $1 + \frac14 + \frac19 + \frac1{16} + \frac1{25} \cdots$

(which is the sum of the reciprocals of squares, so $\zeta(2)$, the Riemann Zeta function), then instead of manually adding every term, we can rely on the fact that every composite number has a prime factorization, doing some analysis we get:

$\zeta(s) = \prod_p \left(1-\frac{1}{p^s}\right)^{-1}$

For $\zeta(2),$ this gives us:

$\left(1-\frac{1}{2^2}\right)^{-1} \left(1-\frac{1}{3^2}\right)^{-1} \left(1-\frac{1}{5^2}\right)^{-1} \left(1-\frac{1}{7^2}\right)^{-1} \left(1-\frac{1}{11^2}\right)^{-1} \left(1-\frac{1}{13^2}\right)^{-1} \cdots$

Now simply, $p$ means some prime number. You can see that in the denominator of each one of those terms, we square the prime number. And this is equal to $\zeta(2),$ and thanks to unique factorization we get this result.

One thing that is useful in mathematics is infinity. The Riemann Zeta function is an infinite sum (as shown before with fractions, here is the complete sum, The Greek letter "sigma" simply means "add these things in a pattern".):

$\zeta(s) = \sum_{n=1}^{\infty}\frac{1}{n^s}$.

However, in many cases we can "truncate" the sum. That means, instead of adding infinitely many terms (which is logically impossible in our world), we can add a finite amount of them, and the more we add, the more accurate it gets to the true value. For example, $\zeta(2) = \frac{\pi^2}{6};$ which is Euler's famous result on the Basel Problem. We can do the same for products, only multiplying a finite amount of times, and each time it gets closer and closer to $\zeta(s).$ And turns out, this is quite useful in many fields.

== Definition ==
A Partial Euler Product is the finite product

$P(s,x)=\prod_{p\le x}\left(1-\frac1{p^s}\right)^{-1},$

where the product goes through primes $p$ less than or equal to $x$. Simply explained, lets assume that $x = 6.$ We know that the prime numbers below 6 are 2, 3, and 5. So, we get:

$\left(1-\frac{1}{2^2}\right)^{-1} \left(1-\frac{1}{3^2}\right)^{-1} \left(1-\frac{1}{5^2}\right)^{-1}$.

(Note: this is easy to simplify, but the "-1" in the exponent is weird. In mathematics, when we have something raised to a negative power, its just a reciprocal. For example, $a^{-1} = \frac{1}{a}, \quad a^{-2} = \frac{1}{a^2},$ etc. So we are just dividing 1 by all those parentheses and multiplying together.)

This specific product is the partial version of the classic Euler Product for the Riemann Zeta function $\zeta(s)$, which is

$\zeta(s) = \prod_{p} \left(1-\frac1{p^s}\right)^{-1}$.

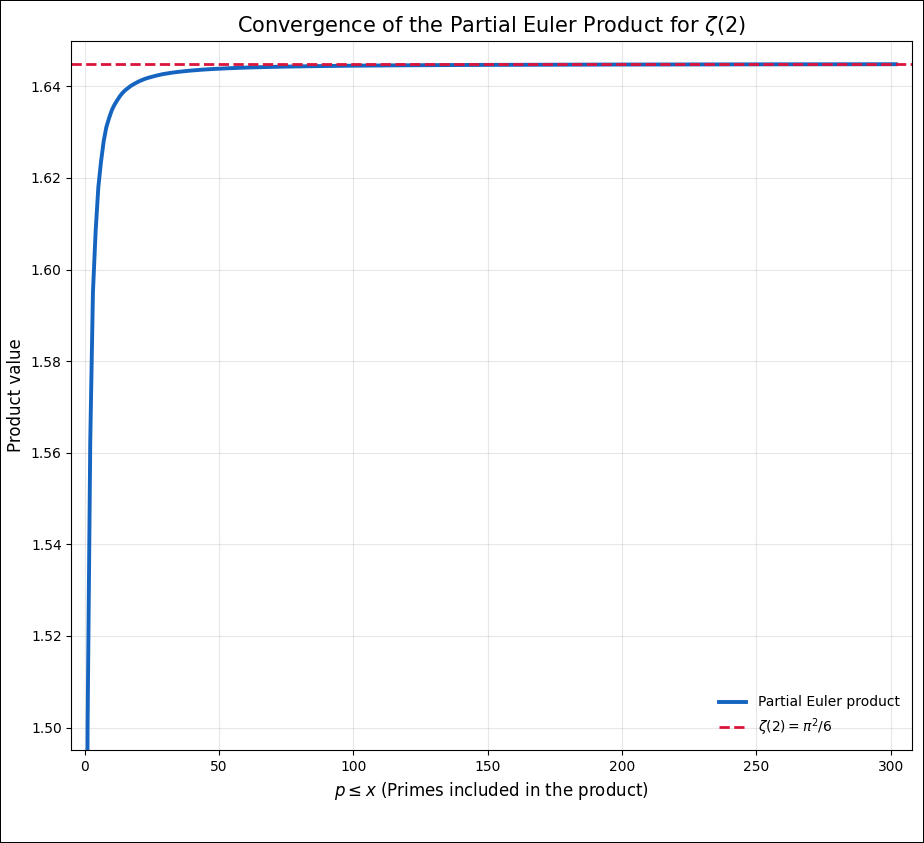

Partial Euler Products also work for any Dirichlet series that have a corresponding Euler Product. They are commonly used in approximations of the corresponding Dirichlet series, for example, the Riemann Zeta function can be approximated (via the product mentioned above). As $x$ increases, the product approximates $\zeta(s)$ in greater detail.

Partial Euler Products also exist for Dirichlet L-Functions. Take the standard Euler Product for a Dirichlet L-Function:

$L(s, \chi) = \prod_p \left(1-\chi(p)p^{-s} \right)^{-1}.$

Its partial Euler Product is:

$L(s, \chi, x) = \prod_{p \leq x} \left(1-\chi(p)p^{-s} \right)^{-1}.$

Now, these formulas are simply extensions of the Riemann Zeta function. We know that

$\zeta(s) = \sum_{n=1}^{\infty} \frac{1}{n^s}$

Which expands to things like $\zeta(2) = \frac11 + \frac1{2^2} + \frac1{3^2} \cdots$. But instead of the 1 in the denominator, we can make it change. For example, lets say that it goes like "1, 0, 1, 0..." and so on. Then, the series is:

$\frac{1}{1} + \frac{0}{2^2} + \frac{1}{3^2} + \frac{0}{4^2} + \frac{1}{5^2} \cdots$

We know that diving 0 by anything is 0, so every even term is 0. So we are just summing the Riemann Zeta function with odd numbers instead of only integers. This also has a closed form like $\frac{\pi^2}{6},$ which is $\frac{\pi^2}{8}.$

== Mertens' theorem ==
In 1874, the Austrian mathematician Franz Mertens proved that:

$\prod_{p \leq x} \left(1-\frac{1}{p}\right)^{-1} \sim e^\gamma \log x, \quad x \rightarrow \infty$

Where $e$ is Euler's number, $\gamma$ is the Euler-Mascheroni constant, $\log x$ is the natural logarithm, and the product goes through primes $p$ less than or equal to $x$. Now all this means is that the Partial Euler Product gets closer and closer to the expression after the ~ (this means asymptotic, getting closer and closer). So as $x$ increases, it gets closer and closer to $e^\gamma \log x$. Here, $e \approx 2.718281828459 \cdots$ (it is irrational, so we can't write down all the decimals) and $\gamma \approx 0.57721.$ So we can say simply (setting, for example, $x = 10$):

$\left(1-\frac12\right)^{-1}\left(1-\frac13\right)^{-1}\left(1-\frac15\right)^{-1}\left(1-\frac17\right)^{-1} \approx 2.718281728459^{0.57721} \log 10$.

Now, $\log x$ is called the logarithm. For example, the equation $2^x = 8$ can be solved with logarithms, which just search for $x:$

$\log_2(8) = x$

Which gives us the solution ($x = 3$). Here, seeing $\log$ without a number below usually refers to the natural logarithm, with the number being $e.$

We may also take reciprocals:

$\prod_{p \leq x} \left(1-\frac{1}{p}\right) \sim \frac{e^{-\gamma}}{\log x}, \quad x \rightarrow \infty.$

Although not a complete Euler Product unto itself, it has relations to Euler Products (the Riemann Zeta function's Partial Euler Product looks quite familiar to this formulae). This product also appears in Sieve Theory, where if you avoid every prime up to $x$, the expected density is that product:

$\prod_{p \leq x} \left(1-\frac{1}{p}\right).$

Simply, this is how "dense" the filtering is if you ignore primes up to $x.$ Notably, this product is also the Partial Euler Product of $\frac{1}{\zeta(1)}.$

== Logarithmic expansion ==
In many areas of Analytic Number Theory, we take logarithms to convert products to double sums for broader analysis. The same principle can be applied to Partial Euler Products; taking logarithms gives:

$\log P(s,x) = -\sum_{p \leq x} \log(1-p^{-s}),$

which expands as

$\log P(s,x) = \sum_{p \leq x} \sum_{k=1}^{\infty} \frac{1}{k p^{ks}}, \qquad \Re(s)>1.$

Now, we can simplify it non-technically. In mathematics, if you don't want to multiply through large products, you can take the logarithm (shown in the previous section). Here, $\log P(s,x)$ expands as this (lets say $x=10$ for example):

$\frac{1}{2^s}+\frac{1}{3^s}+\frac{1}{5^s}+\frac{1}{7^s} +\frac{1}{2}\left(\frac{1}{2^{2s}}+\frac{1}{3^{2s}}+\frac{1}{5^{2s}}+\frac{1}{7^{2s}}\right) +\frac{1}{3}\left(\frac{1}{2^{3s}}+\frac{1}{3^{3s}}+\frac{1}{5^{3s}}+\frac{1}{7^{3s}}\right) +\cdots$

Simply, logarithms let us turn multiplication into double addition with a few changes, thanks to this rule:

$\log(mn) = \log(m) + \log(n)$

Which works for any well-defined logarithm.

In the usual sense, this is used for studying asymptotic behavior (people like J.E. Littlewood and Srinivasa Ramanujanhave worked on this) and allowing the use of analytic methods applicable to double sums over prime powers on these types of products. This method naturally originates from the identity:

$\exp\left(\sum_{i} a_i\right) = \prod_i e^{a_i}.$

Which is just the inverse of the principle shown above.

== Convergence ==
Every Partial Euler Product $P(s, x)$ converges if $x$ is finite (except at values where the individual Euler factor is singular). This follows from the fact that any finite sum or product converge, since the number of terms is finite, the total sum stays bounded and eventually gives a meaningful value. As $x$ increases, the Partial Euler Product approaches the full Euler Product, and thus its correspondent Dirichlet series. Take for example, the Riemann Zeta Function:

$\zeta(s) = \sum_{n=1}^{\infty}\frac{1}{n^s} = \prod_p \left(1-\frac{1}{p^s}\right)^{-1}$.

Simply, this means that since Partial Euler Products are finite (unlike full Euler Products, where we multiply infinitely), we can get approximations. Instead of using analytic methods on full products, we can truncate and study their behavior. And finite products always give a meaningful value - for example, $\zeta(s)$ only works when $s$ is greater than 1. Otherwise, the sum diverges (goes to infinity, like adding more and more things without scaling down). Same goes for the Euler Product, it only works for $s>1.$ Partial Euler Products, however, work anywhere. So, we can study what happens in "before-undefined" territories of $\zeta(s),$ allowing for new results.

As introduced earlier, its Partial Euler Product is

$P(s,x)=\prod_{p\le x}\left(1-\frac1{p^s}\right)^{-1}$

and as $x$ increases, the total product approaches $\zeta(s).$ However, the full product only converges when $\Re(s) > 1,$ so the partial product is useful for approximations and convergence tests. This same principle applies to any Dirichlet series with an Euler Product, for example the Dirichlet L-Functions:

$L(s, \chi) = \prod_p \left(1-\chi(p)p^{-s} \right)^{-1}$

and its partial product:

$L(s, \chi, x) = \prod_{p \leq x} \left(1-\chi(p)p^{-s} \right)^{-1}.$

The partial product always converges if $x$ is finite, and approaches the total product as $x \rightarrow \infty.$

Again, to simplify: $\chi(n)$ is just a function. If $\chi(n) = 1$ for any $n$ that you give the function, we get $\zeta(s).$ Moreover, $\chi(n)$ can have different behavior, but most importantly it's confined to integers, so you give it a whole, and it returns a whole. Putting different numbers (usually -1, 1, 0, which change depending on behavior, sometimes related to prime detection) gives different numbers and behavior. This goes for L-functions too: Partial Euler Products converge, we analyze parts where the full product doesn't work, get new asymptotic results, and so on. Note for the future, this works for any "zeta-like" function (proper term is Dirichlet series) that has an Euler Product.

== Modern developments ==
Ever after Euler published his result on the Euler Product for the Riemann Zeta function, several advancements relating to Partial Euler Products have been made. It mainly began with Mertens' 3rd Theorem (as seen above), alongside work by Ramanujan and Littlewood. One of the greater relations of Partial Euler Products is to Elliptic Curve L-Functions. Notably, the paper published on November 2018 by Keith Conrad. The abstract reads:

The initial version of the Birch and Swinnerton-Dyer conjecture concerned asymptotics for partial Euler products for an elliptic curve L-function at $s=1$. Goldfeld later proved that these asymptotics imply the Riemann hypothesis for the L-function and that the constant in the asymptotics has an unexpected factor of $\sqrt 2$. We extend Goldfeld's theorem to an analysis of partial Euler products for a typical L-function along its critical line. The general $\sqrt 2$ phenomenon is related to second moments, while the asymptotic behavior (over number fields) is proved to be equivalent to a condition that in a precise sense seems much deeper than the Riemann hypothesis. Over function fields, the Euler product asymptotics can sometimes be proved unconditionally.

This paper is also related to Goldfeld's paper, where he showed that if the conjectured asymptotic (the original Birch and Swinnerton-Dyer formulation)

$\prod_{p \leq x} \frac{N_p}{p} \sim C(\log x)^r$

holds, then the Riemann Hypothesis for the Elliptic Curve L-Function holds, we get the correct order of vanishing at $s=1,$ and he noted a weird relation with $\sqrt 2.$

=== Simplified version ===
Elliptic curves are geometric objects defined by polynomials, but they can also be associated with L-Functions (note: L-Function simply refers to the "modified zeta" concept explained earlier). And like any other L-Function, they have Euler Products (and thus Partial Euler Products). Goldfeld has shown, that if the growth of these partial products satisfies a nice relation of $C(\log x)^r$, then the corresponding L-Function satisfies the Riemann Hypothesis (for that L-Function only), a central conjecture in mathematics concerning where the zeros (numbers that if you give to the L-Function you get 0) of those L-functions are. Mainly, they believe that they all have "real part $\frac12$". (Zeros are complex numbers, which are basically points on a 2d grid. "Real part" means how far horizontally, like on a number line. Here, they believe they all are one-half away from the start. More info can be read on Complex Numbers). Conrad, a mathematician who extended Goldfeld's work, also notes that some of the results have weird occurrences of the number $\sqrt 2,$ the square root of 2.
