= Feller–Tornier constant =

In mathematics, the Feller–Tornier constant C_{FT} is the density of the set of all positive integers that have an even number of distinct prime factors raised to a power larger than one (ignoring any prime factors which appear only to the first power). It is named after William Feller (1906–1970) and Erhard Tornier (1894–1982)

$$\begin{align}
C_\text{FT} & ={1\over2}+\left( {1\over2} \prod_{n=1}^\infty \left(1-{2 \over p_n^2} \right) \right) \\[4pt]
& =  {{1}\over{2}}\left(1+ \prod_{n=1}^\infty \left(1 - {{2}\over{p_n^2}} \right) \right) \\[4pt]
& =  {1\over2}\left(1+{{1}\over{\zeta(2)}} \prod_{n=1}^\infty \left( 1-{{1}\over{p_n^2 -1}} \right) \right) \\[4pt]
& =  {1\over2}+{{3}\over{\pi^2}} \prod_{n=1}^\infty \left( 1-{{1} \over {p_n^2 -1}} \right)= 0.66131704946\ldots
\end{align}$$

(sequence A065493 in the OEIS)

== Omega function ==
The Big Omega function is given by

$$\Omega(x) = \text{the number of prime factors of } x \text{ counted by multiplicities}$$

The Iverson bracket is

$$[P] = \begin{cases} 1 & \text{if } P \text{ is true,} \\ 0 & \text{if } P \text{ is false.} \end{cases}$$

With these notations, we have

$$C_\text{FT}= \lim_{n\to \infty} \frac{\sum_{k=1}^n ([\Omega(k) \equiv 0 \bmod 2])} {n}$$

== Prime zeta function ==
The prime zeta function P is give by

$$P(s) = \sum_{p \text{ is prime}} \frac 1 {p^s}.$$

The Feller–Tornier constant satisfies

$$C_\text{FT}= {1\over2} \left(  1+ \exp \left( -\sum_{n=1}^\infty {2^n P(2n) \over n} \right) \right).$$

== See also ==
- Riemann zeta function
- L-function
- Euler product
- Twin prime
