= Grand Riemann hypothesis =

Generalization of the Riemann hypothesis

In mathematics, the grand Riemann hypothesis is a generalisation of both the Riemann hypothesis and the generalized Riemann hypothesis. It states that the non-trivial zeros of all automorphic L-functions lie on the critical line $1/2 + it$ with $t$ a real number variable and $i$ the imaginary unit.

The modified grand Riemann hypothesis is the assertion that the nontrivial zeros of all automorphic L-functions lie on the critical line or the real line.

== Notes ==
- Robert Langlands, in his general functoriality conjectures, asserts that all global L-functions should be automorphic.
- A Siegel zero was a conjectural counterexample for Dirichlet L-series near s = 1. It was conjectured not to exist in 2002, and in 2026, OpenAI released a proof that no such counterexample could exist.
- L-functions of Maass cusp forms can have trivial zeros which are off the real line.
