= Dirichlet density =

Concept in number theory

In mathematics, the Dirichlet density (or analytic density) of a set of primes, named after Peter Gustav Lejeune Dirichlet, is a measure of the size of the set that is easier to use than the natural density.

== Definition ==
If A is a subset of the prime numbers, the Dirichlet density of A is the limit

$$\lim_{s\rightarrow 1^+} \frac{\sum_{p\in A}{1\over p^s}}{\sum_{p} \frac{1}{p^s}}$$

if it exists. Note that since $\textstyle{\sum_{p}\frac{1}{p^s}\sim \log(\frac{1}{s-1})}$ as $s\rightarrow 1^+$ (see Prime zeta function), this is also equal to

$$\lim_{s\rightarrow 1^+}{\sum_{p\in A}{1\over p^s}\over \log(\frac{1}{s-1})}.$$

This expression is usually the order of the "pole" of

$$\prod_{p\in A}{1\over 1-p^{-s}}$$

at s = 1, (though in general it is not really a pole as it has non-integral order), at least if this function is a holomorphic function times a (real) power of s−1 near s = 1. For example, if A is the set of all primes, it is the Riemann zeta function which has a pole of order 1 at s = 1, so the set of all primes has Dirichlet density 1.

More generally, one can define the Dirichlet density of a sequence of primes (or prime powers), possibly with repetitions, in the same way.

== Properties ==
If a subset of primes A has a natural density, given by the limit of

(number of elements of A less than N)/(number of primes less than N)

then it also has a Dirichlet density, and the two densities are the same. However it is usually easier to show that a set of primes has a Dirichlet density, and this is good enough for many purposes. For example, in proving Dirichlet's theorem on arithmetic progressions, it is easy to show that the set of primes in an arithmetic progression a + nb (for a, b coprime) has Dirichlet density 1/φ(b), which is enough to show that there are an infinite number of such primes, but harder to show that this is the natural density.

Roughly speaking, proving that some set of primes has a non-zero Dirichlet density usually involves showing that certain L-functions do not vanish at the point s = 1, while showing that they have a natural density involves showing that the L-functions have no zeros on the line Re(s) = 1.

In practice, if some "naturally occurring" set of primes has a Dirichlet density, then it also has a natural density, but it is possible to find artificial counterexamples: for example, the set of primes whose first decimal digit is 1 has no natural density, but has Dirichlet density log(2)/log(10).

== See also ==
- Natural density
