= Biquadratic field =

Object from algebraic number theory

In mathematics, a biquadratic field is a number field $K$ of a particular kind, which is a Galois extension of degree 4 of the rational number field $\Q$ with Galois group isomorphic to the Klein four-group.

== Structure and subfields ==
Biquadratic fields are obtained by adjoining two square roots of rational numbers $a,b$:

$$K = \mathbb{Q} \left( \sqrt{a}, \sqrt{b} \right).$$

Without loss of generality, we may assume a and b are non-zero square-free integers.

The Galois group has three subgroups of index 2, corresponding to the three quadratic subfields

$\Q(\sqrt a),\Q(\sqrt b),\Q(\sqrt{ab}) \subset K$.

Biquadratic fields are the simplest examples of abelian extensions of $\Q$ that are not cyclic extensions. Also biquadratic fields are usually not monogenic: although there exists a primitive element which generates the field $K$ over $\Q$, its ring of integers $\mathcal{O}_K$ might not possess a single generator over $\Z$.
