= Adolf Piltz =

German mathematician (1855–1940)

- Born: 8 December 1855; Ilmenau, Saxe-Weimar-Eisenach
- Died: 1940; Großheringen, Thuringia, Nazi Germany
- Education: University of Berlin; University of Jena
- Scientific career
- Fields: Mathematics
- Workplaces: University of Jena
- Theses: Über das Gesetz, nach welchem die mittlere Darstellbarkeit der natürlichen Zahlen als Produkte einer gegebenen Anzahl Faktoren mit der Grösse der Zahlen wächst (1881, Ph.D.); Über die Häufigkeit der Primzahlen in arithmetischen Progressionen und über verwandte Gesetze (1884, habil.)
- Doctoral advisor: Ernst Kummer; Karl Weierstrass; Carl Johannes Thomae

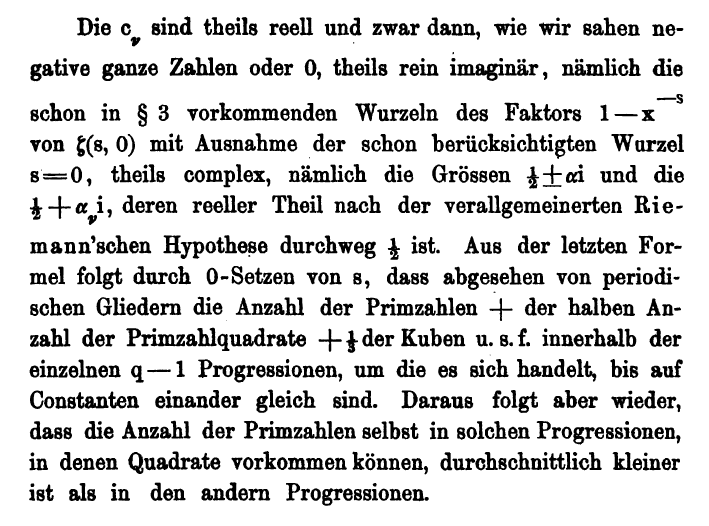
In Piltz's habilitation thesis (1884) the generalized Riemann hypothesis is mentioned.

Adolf Piltz (8 December 1855 – 1940) was a German mathematician who contributed to number theory. Piltz was arguably the first to formulate a generalized Riemann hypothesis, in 1884.
