= Functional equation (L-function) =

In mathematics, the L-functions of number theory are expected to have several characteristic properties, one of which is that they satisfy certain functional equations. There is an elaborate theory of what these equations should be, much of which is still conjectural.

== Introduction ==
A prototypical example, the Riemann zeta function has a functional equation relating its value at the complex number s with its value at 1 − s. In every case this relates to some value ζ(s) that is only defined by analytic continuation from the infinite series definition. That is, writing – as is conventional – σ for the real part of s, the functional equation relates the cases

σ > 1 and σ < 0,

and also changes a case with

0 < σ < 1

in the critical strip to another such case, reflected in the line σ = ½. Therefore, use of the functional equation is basic, in order to study the zeta-function in the whole complex plane.

The functional equation in question for the Riemann zeta function takes the simple form

$$Z(s) = Z(1-s) \,$$

where Z(s) is ζ(s) multiplied by a gamma-factor, involving the gamma function. This is now read as an 'extra' factor in the Euler product for the zeta-function, corresponding to the infinite prime. Just the same shape of functional equation holds for the Dedekind zeta function of a number field K, with an appropriate gamma-factor that depends only on the embeddings of K (in algebraic terms, on the tensor product of K with the real field).

There is a similar equation for the Dirichlet L-functions, but this time relating them in pairs:

$$\Lambda(s,\chi)=\varepsilon\Lambda(1-s,\chi^*)$$

with χ a primitive Dirichlet character, χ^{*} its complex conjugate, Λ the L-function multiplied by a gamma-factor, and ε a complex number of absolute value 1, of shape

$$G(\chi) \over {\left |G(\chi)\right \vert}$$

where G(χ) is a Gauss sum formed from χ. This equation has the same function on both sides if and only if χ is a real character, taking values in {0,1,−1}. Then ε must be 1 or −1, and the case of the value −1 would imply a zero of Λ(s) at s = ½. According to the theory (of Gauss, in effect) of Gauss sums, the value is always 1, so no such simple zero can exist (the function is even about the point).

== Theory of functional equations ==
A unified theory of such functional equations was given by Erich Hecke, and the theory was taken up again in Tate's thesis by John Tate. Hecke found generalised characters of number fields, now called Hecke characters, for which his proof (based on theta functions) also worked. These characters and their associated L-functions are now understood to be strictly related to complex multiplication, as the Dirichlet characters are to cyclotomic fields.

There are also functional equations for the local zeta-functions, arising at a fundamental level for the (analogue of) Poincaré duality in étale cohomology. The Euler products of the Hasse–Weil zeta-function for an algebraic variety V over a number field K, formed by reducing modulo prime ideals to get local zeta-functions, are conjectured to have a global functional equation; but this is currently considered out of reach except in special cases. The definition can be read directly out of étale cohomology theory, again; but in general some assumption coming from automorphic representation theory seems required to get the functional equation. The Taniyama–Shimura conjecture was a particular case of this as general theory. By relating the gamma-factor aspect to Hodge theory, and detailed studies of the expected ε factor, the theory as empirical has been brought to quite a refined state, even if proofs are missing.

== See also ==
- Explicit formula (L-function)
- Riemann–Siegel formula (particular approximate functional equation)
