= L-function =

Meromorphic function on the complex plane

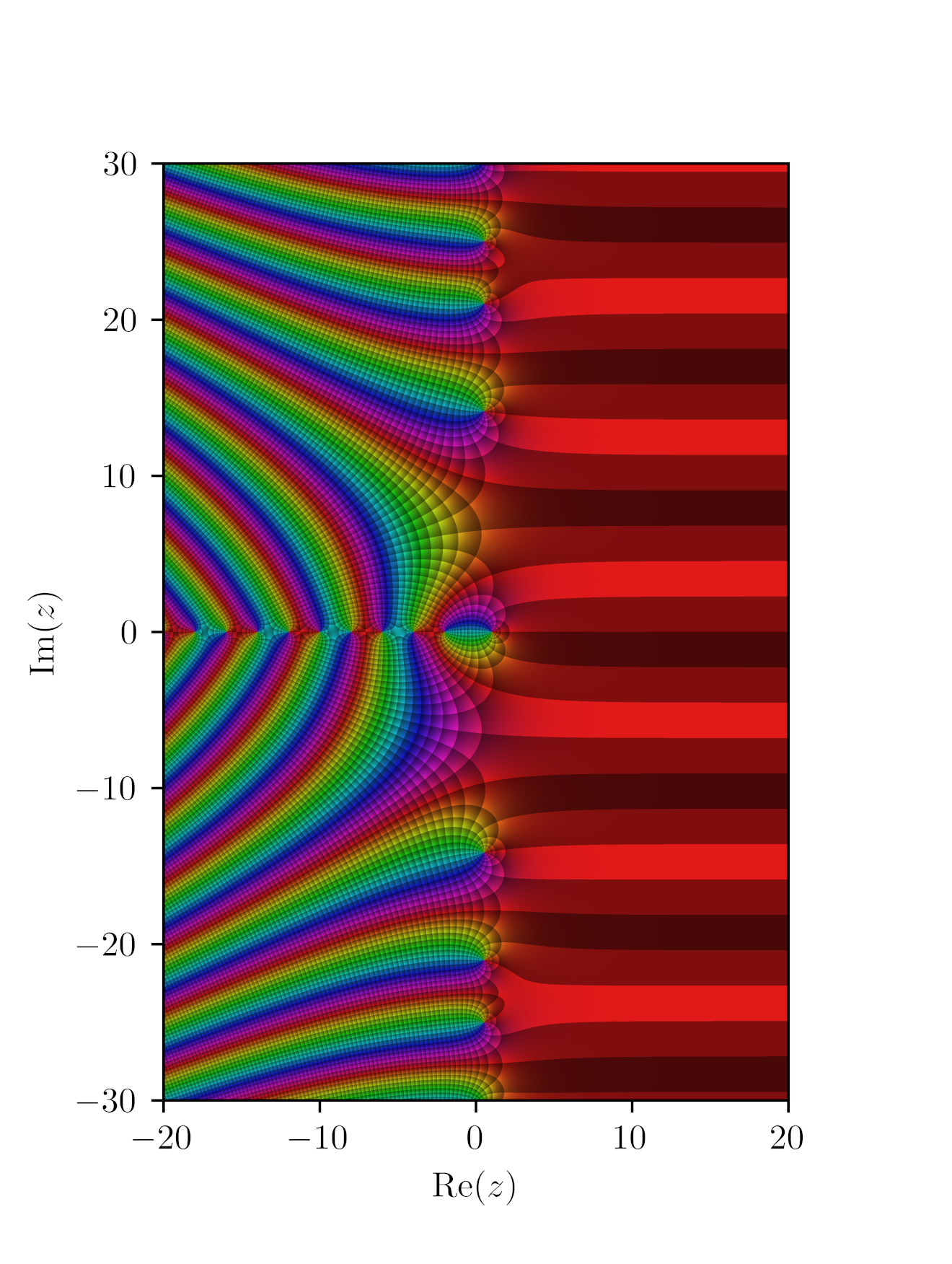
The Riemann zeta function can be thought of as the archetype for all L-functions.

An L-function is a meromorphic function on the complex plane, and one out of several categories of mathematical objects studied in analytic number theory and related fields. L-functions share fundamental properties and characteristics with the Riemann zeta function, which serves as the prototypical example of an L-function; therefore, L-functions are generalisations of the Riemann zeta function. Some important conjectures involving L-functions are, consequently, the Riemann hypothesis and its generalisations.

A Dirichlet series, usually convergent on a half-plane, that may give rise to an L-function via analytic continuation, is called an L-series.

Fundamental subclasses of L-functions were built on the work of Leonhard Euler (which is now known as the Riemann zeta function). Most notably, the mathematicians Bernhard Riemann (1826–1866), Richard Dedekind (1831–1916), Erich Hecke (1887–1947) and Emil Artin (1898–1962) investigated the subclasses of L-functions, discovering eponymous L-functions each.

The terms "L-function" and "zeta-function" are often used synonymously due to the fundamentally similar and derivative nature of the work, however, not all zeta-functions are L-functions. Most notably, the Prime zeta function is not an L-function, since they cannot be analytically extended to the entire complex plane.

== Definition ==
As one might infer from the introduction, there is still no general and widely accepted definition of an L-function and its construction. Various constructions and definitions as per various prominent authors can be found as follows.

=== Iwaniec and Kowalski's Analytic Number Theory, 2004 ===
This definition is abstract and incomplete in the sense that it doesn't specify the arithmetic objects to which he assigns L-functions, nor the exact mechanism of this assignment. However, it includes properties generally expected of L-functions.

The definition is extended and starts by defining 6 preliminary definitions, as follows:

==== Dirichlet Series and Euler Product ====
The arithmetic object $\textstyle f$ is associated with a Dirichlet series:

$$\sum_{n\in\mathbb N} \lambda(f,n) n^{-s}$$,

which is also called an L-series, and an Euler product:

$$\prod_{p\in\mathbb P} (1-\alpha_1(f,p)p^{-s})^{-1}\cdot\cdots\cdot (1-\alpha_d(f,p)p^{-s})^{-1}$$.

Here, $\textstyle \lambda(f,n)\in\mathbb C$ for all natural numbers $\textstyle n\in\mathbb N$, and $\textstyle \lambda(f,1)=1$. $\textstyle \mathbb P$ denotes the set of all prime numbers.

The natural number $\textstyle d\in\mathbb N$ is called the “degree” of the L-function or the Euler product $\textstyle L(f,s)$. For every prime number $\textstyle p$ and every $\textstyle i\in\{1,\ldots,d\}$, we have $\textstyle \alpha_i(f,p)\in\mathbb C$.

The complex numbers $\textstyle \alpha_i(f,p)\in\mathbb C$ are called local roots or local parameters of $\textstyle L(f,s)\in\mathbb C$ at $\textstyle p\in\mathbb P$.

For a given $p\in\mathbb P$, the expression

$$(1-\alpha_1(f,p)p^{-s})^{-1}\cdot\cdots\cdot (1-\alpha_d(f,p)p^{-s})^{-1}$$,

that is, the $p$_{th} factor in the Euler product, which is called the Euler factor of $L(f,s)$ at $p$.

==== Gamma Factor ====
The object $\textstyle f$ is assigned a so-called gamma factor:

$$\gamma(f,s)=\pi^{-ds/2} \prod_{j=1}^d \Gamma\left(\frac{s+\kappa_j}{2}\right)$$

where $\textstyle \Gamma$ denotes the gamma function, $\textstyle \pi$ denotes the automorphic number, and $\textstyle d$ denotes the degree of the L-function mentioned above. The parameters $\textstyle \kappa_j$ are complex numbers. They are called the local parameters of $\textstyle L(f,s)$ at infinity, or at the infinite prime point.

==== Leader (Conductor) ====
A natural number is also assigned to the object $\textstyle f$

$$q(f)\in\mathbb N$$,

This is the so-called “leader” or “conductor” of the L-function $\textstyle L(f,s)$. The prime numbers $p\in\mathbb P$ that do not divide $\textstyle q(f)$ are called unbranched with respect to the L-function $\textstyle L(f,s)$.

==== Complete L-Function ====
Using the Dirichlet series, the gamma factor, and the leading coefficient associated with $\textstyle f$, we can now define the so-called complete L-function of $\textstyle f$:

$$\Lambda(f,s) = q(f)^{s/2} \gamma(f,s) L(f,s).$$

==== Root ====
Furthermore, the object $\textstyle f$ is associated with a complex number

$$\epsilon(f)\in\mathbb C$$

This complex number is called the root of the L-function $\textstyle L(f,s)$.

==== Dual, Arithmetic Object ====
Now, the arithmetic object $\textstyle f$ is associated with another arithmetic object (which is not specified in detail within the framework of this abstract definition). It is called the dual of $\textstyle f$ and is denoted by $\textstyle \bar{f}$. As in the case of $\textstyle f$, $\textstyle \bar{f}$ is also a Dirichlet series

$$\sum_{n\in\mathbb N} \lambda(\bar{f},n) n^{-s}$$,

an Euler product

$$\prod_{p\in\mathbb P} (1-\alpha_1(\bar{f},p)p^{-s})^{-1}\cdot\ldots\cdot (1-\alpha_{\bar{d}}(\bar{f},p)p^{-s})^{-1}$$

with $\textstyle \bar{d}\in\mathbb N$, a gamma factor $\textstyle \gamma(\bar{f},s)$, a leading term $\textstyle q(\bar{f})$, and a complete L-function $\textstyle \Lambda(\bar{f},s)$.

If $\textstyle f=\bar{f}$, then $\textstyle L(f,s)$ is called self-dual, which means nothing other than $\textstyle \lambda(f,n)\in\mathbb R$ for all $\textstyle n\in\mathbb N$.

==== Conditions to satisfy ====
The objects mentioned above, associated with the arithmetic object $\textstyle f$, must now satisfy the following conditions so that $\textstyle L(f,s)$ satisfies the definition of an L-function according to Iwaniec and Kowalski:

Conditions to satisfy for the arithmetic object $f$
| Index | Condition | Description |
|---|---|---|
| 1 | Absolute value of local parameters for $\textstyle p$ | For every prime number $\textstyle p$ and every $\textstyle i\in\{1,\ldots,d\}$, we have $\textstyle |\alpha_i(f,p)|<p$. |
| 2 | Values of local parameters for unbranched $\textstyle p$ | For all primes $\textstyle p$ that are unramified with respect to $\textstyle L(f,s)$, and for all $\textstyle i\in\{1,\ldots,d\}$, we have $\textstyle \alpha_i(f,p)\neq 0$. |
| 3 | Requirements for the local parameters at infinity | The parameters $\textstyle \kappa_j$ are either real or appear in the form of complex conjugate pairs in the gamma factor $\textstyle \gamma(f,s)$. Furthermore, $\textstyle \Re(\kappa_j)>-1$ for every $\textstyle j\in\{1,\ldots,d\}$. This last condition ensures that $\textstyle \gamma(f,s)$ has no zeroes in $\textstyle \mathbb C$ and no poles with $\textstyle \Re(s)\ge 1$. $\textstyle \Re$ denotes the real part of a complex number. |
| 4 | Absolute convergence of the Dirichlet Series and the Euler product | Both the Dirichlet series and the Euler product associated with $\textstyle f$ must converge absolutely for $\textstyle \Re(s)>1$. |
| 5 | Agreement between the L-function, the Dirichlet series, and the Euler product in a complex half-plane | The L-function, the Dirichlet series, and the Euler product associated with $\textstyle f$ must coincide in the complex half-plane $\textstyle \Re(s)>1$: $$L(f,s)= \sum_{n\in\mathbb N} \lambda(f,n) n^{-s}= \prod_{p\in\mathbb P} (1-\alpha_1(f,p)p^{-s})^{-1}\cdot\cdots\cdot (1-\alpha_d(f,p)p^{-s})^{-1}.$$ |
| 6 | Analytic Continuity and Pole Points | It follows from the conditions that the $\textstyle f$ must satisfy that the Dirichlet series is holomorphic in the half-plane $\textstyle \Re(s)>1$. However, this must also be analytically extendable to a meromorphic function of order 1 on the entire $\mathbb C$, which has poles at most at $\textstyle s=0$ and $\textstyle s=1$. |
| 7 | Absolute value of the root number | The root number $\textstyle \epsilon(f)\in\mathbb C$ has the absolute value 1. Thus, $\textstyle |\epsilon(f)|$ must equal 1. |
| 8 | Requirements for the objects associated with the dual of $\textstyle f$ | With regard to the dual $\textstyle \bar{f}$ of $\textstyle f$, the following must hold: $\textstyle \lambda(\bar{f},n) = \bar{\lambda}(f,n)$ for all :$\textstyle n\in\mathbb N$, as well as $\textstyle \gamma(\bar{f},s)=\gamma(f,s)$ and $$\textstyle q(\bar{f})=q(f)$$. These imply that in the Dirichlet series associated with $\textstyle \bar{f}$, the $\textstyle \lambda$ coefficients are precisely the complex conjugates of the $\textstyle \lambda$ coefficients in the Dirichlet series associated with $\textstyle f$. The gamma factors and leaders associated with $\textstyle f$ and $\textstyle \bar{f}$, respectively, must coincide. |
| 9 | Functional equation | The two complete L-functions associated with $\textstyle f$ and $\textstyle \bar{f}$, respectively, satisfy the functional equation $$\Lambda(f,s)=\epsilon(f) \Lambda(\bar{f},1-s)$$ for all $\textstyle s\in\mathbb C$. |

Iwaniec and Kowalski’s definition reflects the fact that a function that is considered an L-function typically appears as a mapping of the L-function to a mathematical object (e.g., a Dirichlet character or an algebraic number field). Their definition is abstract and incomplete, as it leaves open the question of exactly what those mathematical objects are and how that mapping is to be carried out.

=== Atle Selberg in the Amalfi Conference on Analytic Number Theory, 1992 ===
The definition proposed by the Norwegian-American mathematician Atle Selberg in 1989 is independent of other mathematical objects. In a non-abstract, unambiguous definition, he specifies a subset of the set of all Dirichlet series whose elements must satisfy certain properties: absolute convergence of the Dirichlet series, analytic continuation, functional equation, Ramanujan conjecture (Note: The Ramanujan conjecture refers to the coefficients $\textstyle\lambda(f,n)$ of the Dirichlet series. It states: For any $\textstyle\epsilon > 0$, $\textstyle \lambda(f,n)=O(n^\epsilon)$. Here, the implicit constant in the Landau symbol $\textstyle O$ may depend on $\textstyle \epsilon$.) and Euler product. This subset is today referred to as the Selberg class.

The overarching hypothesis and the motivating background for the definition of the Selberg class is the so-called Great Riemann Hypothesis. Applied to the Selberg class, this hypothesis states that no zero of an analytic continuation of a Dirichlet series in the Selberg class has a real part greater than 1/2. In the case of the (supposedly) simplest element of the Selberg class (the Riemann Dirichlet series together with its analytic continuation to the Riemann zeta function), this conjecture corresponds to the Riemann Hypothesis, which to this day has been neither proven nor disproven.

It is against this backdrop that the remaining shortcomings in the definition of the term L-function must be viewed: one would like to define the term "L-function" in such a way that L-functions verifiably satisfy the Great Riemann Hypothesis. Yet, on the other hand, one has not even been able to prove the simplest case (the Riemann Hypothesis for the Riemann zeta function), which could be a sign of a lack of understanding of the Riemann zeta function and thus makes it difficult to provide a clear definition of the generalized concept of a L-function.

== Examples ==
This section provides an overview of basic examples of L-functions.

=== Riemann Zeta Function ===
The simplest example of an L-function, and at the same time the fundamental basis for any definition of the term L-function based on the work of Leonhard Euler, is the Riemann zeta function $\textstyle\zeta$.

One of the possible “arithmetic objects” $\textstyle f$ in the sense of the definition approach by Iwaniec and Kowalski, to which this L-function can be assigned, is the field $\textstyle \mathbb Q$ of the rational numbers. Its Dirichlet series

$$\sum_{n\in\mathbb N} \frac{1}{n^s}\, ,$$

that is

$$\lambda(\mathbb Q,n)=1$$

for all $\textstyle n\in\mathbb N$, converges absolutely for $\textstyle\Re(s)>1$. Together with its Euler product, which is also absolutely convergent, the following holds for $\textstyle\Re(s)>1$:

$$\zeta(s)=L(\mathbb Q,s)=
\sum_{n\in\mathbb N} \frac{1}{n^s}=
\prod_{p\in\mathbb P} (1-p^{-s})^{-1}.$$

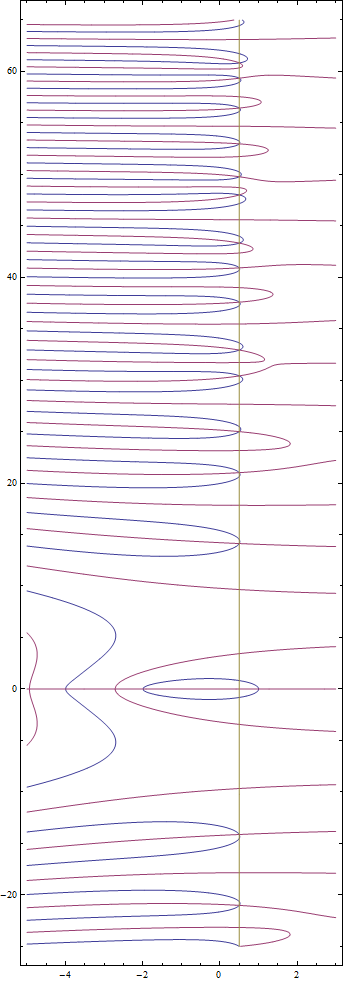
Riemann zeta function $\zeta(s)$: Contour lines for the real part ($\zeta$(s))=0, blue, and the imaginary part ($\zeta$(s))=0, lilac, from −5<Re(s)<3 and −25<Im(s)<65, as well as the “critical line” Re(s)=1/2, brown. For Re(s)<1, the points of intersection of the blue and lilac contour lines are zeros of the Riemann zeta function.

Since all $\textstyle \lambda(\mathbb Q,n)$ are real, namely equal to 1, $\textstyle \zeta(s)$ is self-dual. The object dual to $\textstyle f=\mathbb Q$ is therefore also $\textstyle\mathbb Q$, so $\textstyle \bar{f}=\mathbb Q$.

The degree of the Euler product of the Riemann zeta function is

$$d=1$$.

For its local parameters at $\textstyle p$, the following holds:

$$\alpha(\mathbb Q,p)=1$$

for all $\textstyle p\in\mathbb P$. Usually, the following gamma factor is used for the Riemann zeta function:

$$\gamma(\mathbb Q,s)=\pi^{-\frac{s}{2}}\,\Gamma\left(\frac{s}{2}\right).$$

The local parameter $\textstyle\kappa$ at infinity is therefore 0. The conductor of $\textstyle\zeta$ is

$$\textstyle q(\mathbb Q)=1$$,

so that the complete Riemann zeta function takes the form

$$\Lambda(\mathbb Q,s) := \gamma(\mathbb Q,s) L(\mathbb Q,s)=
\pi^{-\frac{s}{2}}\,\Gamma\left(\frac{s}{2}\right)\zeta(s)$$

This definition is only valid for $\textstyle\Re(s)>1$, since the Riemann zeta function can be defined via its Dirichlet series or its Euler product only in this half-plane. However, the complete Riemann zeta function has an analytic continuation to a meromorphic function on the entire complex plane. This extension is holomorphic except for two simple poles at $\textstyle s=0$ and $\textstyle s=1$ with residues of −1 and 1, respectively. If we also denote the continued, complete Riemann zeta function by $\textstyle \Lambda$, then it satisfies the root number

$$\epsilon(\mathbb Q)=1$$

the functional equation

$$\Lambda(\mathbb Q,s) =
\Lambda(\mathbb Q,1-s).$$

Thus, the Riemann zeta function, initially defined only for $\textstyle \Re(s)>1$ via its Dirichlet series or Euler product, now has an analytic continuation to a meromorphic function on $\mathbb C$, which is undefined only at $\textstyle s=1$, since it has a simple pole with the residue 1 there. If we retain the notation $\textstyle \zeta$ for the continued Riemann zeta function as well, it satisfies the functional equation

$$\pi^{-\frac{s}{2}}\,\Gamma\left(\frac{s}{2}\right)\zeta(s)=
\pi^{-\frac{1-s}{2}}\,\Gamma\left(\frac{1-s}{2}\right)\zeta(1-s).$$

The (analytically extended) Riemann zeta function raises one of the most important questions in analytic number theory: the question of the exact location of its so-called non-trivial zeros. These lie in the “critical strip” $\textstyle 0<\Re(s)<1$. The Riemann Hypothesis from 1859—which remains neither proven nor disproven to this day—posits that all non-trivial zeros of the Riemann zeta function have a real part of $1/2$. A proof of this hypothesis would allow for particularly accurate estimates of the distribution of prime numbers.

=== Dirichlet L-functions ===
The closest relatives of the Riemann zeta function are the Dirichlet L-functions, which include the Riemann zeta function as a special case. While in the Dirichlet series associated with the Riemann zeta function all $\lambda$ coefficients are equal to 1, in Dirichlet L-functions these are defined using a Dirichlet character. They thus take complex values with absolute value 1 or are equal to 0. Let $\textstyle m \in \mathbb{N}$ be an integer, and let $\chi$ be a Dirichlet character modulo $\textstyle m$:

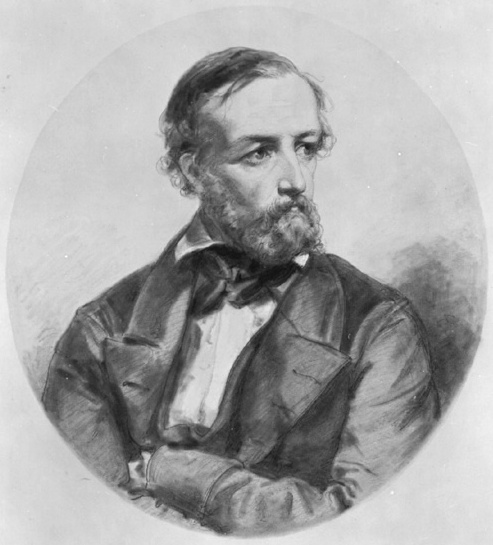
Peter Gustav Lejeune Dirichlet (1805–1859)

$\chi: (\mathbb{Z}/m)^\times \longrightarrow S^1 := \{z \in \mathbb{C} : |z| = 1\}$

is given, i.e., a group homomorphism from the group of elements that are invertible with respect to multiplication in the residue class ring $\textstyle\mathbb Z/m$ to the circle group $\textstyle S^1$ of the complex numbers with absolute value 1. Such a Dirichlet character $\textstyle \chi$ is called primitive, and $\textstyle m$ is the generator of $\textstyle \chi$ if it is not already given by a composition

$$(\mathbb Z / m)^\times \longrightarrow
(\mathbb Z / m')^\times \;\stackrel{\chi'}{\longrightarrow}\; S^1$$

follows from a Dirichlet character $\textstyle\chi'$ modulo $\textstyle m'$ with a proper divisor $\textstyle m'$ of $\textstyle m$. Using such a Dirichlet character $\textstyle \chi$, one defines the following mapping, which is also denoted by $\textstyle \chi$ and referred to as a Dirichlet character modulo $\textstyle m$:

$$\chi:\text{ }\mathbb{Z} \to \mathbb{C},\text {  }
\chi(n) = \begin{cases}\chi(n\operatorname{mod} m) & \text{if}\quad\operatorname{gcd}(n,m)=1 \\ 0 &
\text{if}\quad\operatorname{gcd}(n,m)>1. \end{cases}$$

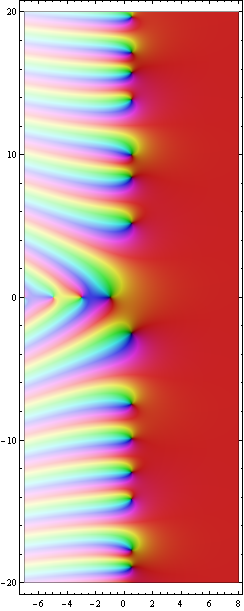
Dirichlet L-function for the Dirichlet character $\textstyle\chi$ modulo 7 with $\textstyle \chi(3) = \exp (i\pi/3)$ for complex s with −7 < Re(s) < 8 and −20 < Im(s) < 20: The similarity to the Riemann zeta function is striking. Nevertheless, there are clear differences: Since $\chi$ is a non-trivial Dirichlet character, the function depicted is entire. Thus, it has no pole at $s=1$, unlike the Riemann zeta function. Compared to the Riemann zeta function, the real (trivial) zeros are shifted one unit to the right. They are visible as black dots at −1, −3, −5, etc., in the graph. The black dots in the vertical strip 0<Re(s)<1 belong to the infinitely many non-real (non-trivial) zeros of this Dirichlet L-function. The Great Riemann Hypothesis predicts that each of these non-trivial zeros lies on the vertical line Re(s)=1/2.

The trivial Dirichlet characters $\textstyle \chi^0$ modulo $m$ take the value 1 if $\textstyle \operatorname{gcd}(n,m)=1$, and 0 otherwise. The trivial Dirichlet character modulo 1 is called the principal character. It satisfies $\chi(n)=1$ for all $n\in\N$.

Now, if $\textstyle\chi: \mathbb{Z} \to \mathbb{C}$ is a primitive Dirichlet character modulo $\textstyle m$, then an L-function is assigned to this arithmetic object $\chi$ as follows: With

$$\lambda(\chi,n):=\chi(n)$$

the Dirichlet series (also called the Dirichlet L-series)

$$L(\chi,s):=\sum_{n\in\mathbb N} \frac{\lambda(\chi,n)}{n^s}=\sum_{n\in\mathbb N} \frac{\chi(n)}{n^s}$$

for $\textstyle \Re(s)>1$ is absolute. With the local parameters for $\textstyle p$

$$\alpha(\chi,p):=\chi(p)$$

this also holds for the corresponding Euler product, and we have the identity

$$L(\chi,s)=
\sum_{n\in\mathbb N} \frac{\chi(n)}{n^s}=
\prod_{p\in\mathbb P} (1-\chi(p)p^{-s})^{-1}$$

for $\textstyle \Re(s)>1$. As with the Riemann zeta function,

$$d=1$$

is the order of the Euler product. If we set $\textstyle \kappa=0$ when $\textstyle\chi(-1)=1$ (in this case, $\textstyle\chi$ is called “even”), and $\textstyle \kappa=1$ if $\textstyle\chi(-1)=-1$ (in this case, $\textstyle\chi$ is called “odd”), then

$$\gamma(\chi,s)=\pi^{-\frac{s}{2}}\,\Gamma\left(\frac{s+\kappa}{2}\right)$$

the gamma factor associated with $\textstyle\chi$. That $\textstyle\kappa\in\{0, 1\}$ is thus the local parameter at the infinite prime point. The leader $\textstyle m$ of the primitive Dirichlet character $\textstyle\chi$ is also the leader of the Dirichlet L-function:

$$q(\chi)=m$$.

The complete Dirichlet L-function thus has the form

$$\Lambda(\chi,s) := q(\chi)^\frac{s}{2} \gamma(\chi,s) L(\chi,s)=
\left(\frac{m}{\pi}\right)^{\frac{s}{2}} \Gamma\left(\frac{s+\kappa}{2}\right)\sum_{n\in\mathbb N} \frac{\chi(n)}{n^s},$$

A definition that holds only for $\textstyle\Re(s)>1$, since the Dirichlet series used converges only there. However, such a complete Dirichlet L-function can be analytically extended to $\textstyle\mathbb C$. This results in an integral function if $\textstyle\chi$ is a non-trivial Dirichlet character. Otherwise, the extended function has a simple pole at $\textstyle s=1$ with residue 1. The object dual to $\textstyle\chi$ is $\overline{\chi}$, i.e., the Dirichlet character obtained from $\textstyle\chi$ by complex conjugation of the function values of $\textstyle\chi$, i.e.,

$$\textstyle\overline{\chi}(n)=\overline{\chi(n)}$$

for all $\textstyle n\in\mathbb N$. The root number $\textstyle\epsilon(\chi)$ can be determined using the Gaussian sum

$$\tau(\chi)=
\sum_{x \operatorname{mod} q(\chi)} \chi(x)\exp(2 \pi i x/q(\chi))$$

where the summation extends over all residue classes modulo the generator $\textstyle q(\chi)=m$ and $\textstyle\pi$ denotes the circular number, $\textstyle i$ denotes the imaginary unit, and $\exp$ denotes the exponential function. With

$$\epsilon(\chi) =
\begin{cases}
\frac{\tau(\chi)}{\sqrt{q(\chi)}} & \text{if}\quad\chi(-1)=1 \\
\frac{\tau(\chi)}{i\sqrt{q(\chi)}} & \text{if}\quad\chi(-1)=-1
\end{cases}$$

then the extended, complete Dirichlet L-function satisfies the functional equation

$$\Lambda(\chi,s) =
\epsilon(\chi)\Lambda(\overline{\chi},1-s).$$

As required by the root number theorem, $\textstyle |\epsilon(\chi)|=1$, since $\textstyle |\tau(\chi)|=\sqrt{q(\chi)}$. The Dirichlet L-functions include the Riemann zeta function, since it arises from the trivial Dirichlet character modulo 1, i.e., the principal character.

In 1837, the German mathematician Peter Gustav Dirichlet used the Dirichlet L-functions, named after him, to prove the Dirichlet's prime number theorem, according to which in every arithmetic sequence (also called an arithmetic progression)

$$a, a\pm n, a\pm 2n, a\pm 3n, \ldots, \text{ with }\operatorname{gcd}(a,n)=1,$$

where $a,n\in\mathbb N$

Namely, that in every residue class $\textstyle a\operatorname{mod} n$, there are infinitely many prime numbers. The decisive argument in the proof of Dirichlet’s prime number theorem is the realization that $\textstyle \Lambda(\chi,1)\neq 0$ holds for every non-trivial Dirichlet character $\textstyle\chi$.

=== Dedekind L-functions ===
The Riemann zeta function is defined on the field $\textstyle \mathbb Q$ of rational numbers, the simplest algebraic number field. Dedekind L-functions generalize this reference to arbitrary algebraic number fields, i.e., finite field extensions of $\textstyle \mathbb Q$, such as $\textstyle \mathbb Q(\sqrt[3]{2})$. Let $K$ be an algebraic number field and let $n_K=[K:\mathbb Q]\in\mathbb N$ be its degree of extension over $\mathbb Q$. Let $\mathcal O_K$ be its integral domain and $d_K\in\Z$ its discriminant. Furthermore, let $n_1\in\mathbb N_0$ be the number of real embeddings and $n_2\in\mathbb N_0$ the number of pairs of complex embeddings of $K$. Thus, $n_K=n_1+2 n_2$.

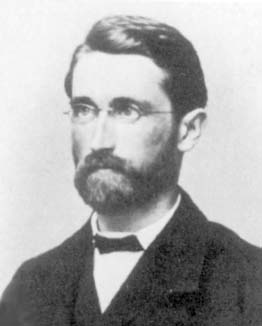
Richard Dedekind (1831–1916)

The Dedekind L-function (also known as the Dedekind zeta function) with respect to $K$ is defined for $\Re(s)>1$ by

$$\zeta_K(s):=L(K,s):=\sum_{0\neq\mathfrak{a}\subset\mathcal O_K} \frac{1}{\mathcal N(\mathfrak{a})^s}.$$

In the sum, $\mathfrak{a}$ runs through all integer ideals of $\mathcal O_K$ that are distinct from the zero ideal $\{0\}$. $\mathcal N(\mathfrak{a})\in\N$ denotes the absolute norm of $\mathfrak{a}$. The coefficients of the Dirichlet series

$$\sum_{0\neq\mathfrak{a}\subset\mathcal O_K} \frac{1}{\mathcal N(\mathfrak{a})^s} =
\sum_{n\in\N} \frac{\lambda(K,n)}{n^s}$$

are thus

$$\lambda(K,n)=
\#\{0\neq\mathfrak{a}\subset\mathcal O_K \mid \mathcal N(\mathfrak{a})=n \}\in\N_0.$$

For every $n\in\N$, they specify the number of integral ideals of $\mathcal O_K$ with absolute norm $n$. In particular, all coefficients $\lambda(K,n)$ are real, and therefore $L(K,s)$ is self-dual. That Dirichlet series converges absolutely for $\Re(s)>1$, as does the corresponding Euler product

$$\prod_{0\neq\mathfrak{p}\subset\mathcal O_K} \frac{1}{1-\mathcal N(\mathfrak{p})^{-s}}.$$

Here, the product extends over all prime ideals $\mathfrak{p}$ of $\mathcal O_K$ that are distinct from the zero ideal. For $\Re(s)>1$, the following identity holds

$$L(K,s)=
\sum_{0\neq\mathfrak{a}\subset\mathcal O_K} \frac{1}{\mathcal N(\mathfrak{a})^s}=
\sum_{n\in\N} \frac{\lambda(K,n)}{n^s}=
\prod_{0\neq\mathfrak{p}\subset\mathcal O_K} \frac{1}{1-\mathcal N(\mathfrak{p})^{-s}}.$$

This form of the Euler product does not yet show the individual Euler factors $(1-\alpha_1(K,p)p^{-s})^{-1}\cdot\ldots\cdot (1-\alpha_d(K,p)p^{-s})^{-1}$. In any case, the degree of the Euler product is equal to the degree of the field extension $K/\mathbb Q$:

$$d=[K:\mathbb Q]=n_K=n_1+2 n_2.$$

The local parameters $\alpha_j(K,p)$ depend on the decomposition behavior of the ideals $(p):=p\mathcal O_K$

every ideal $(p)$ has a “prime ideal decomposition” that is unique up to the order of the factors

$$(p)=\prod_{\mathfrak{p}} \mathfrak{p}^{e_\mathfrak{p}}$$

in prime ideals $0\neq\mathfrak{p}\subset\mathcal O_K$, where the following holds: $e_\mathfrak{p}\in\N_0$ and $e_\mathfrak{p}>0$ for only finitely many prime ideals $\mathfrak{p}$. For at most $n_K$ prime ideals $\mathfrak{p}$, $e_\mathfrak{p}>0$ may hold. Such $\mathfrak{p}$ divide $(p)$, and we write $\mathfrak{p}|(p)$. The exponent $e_\mathfrak{p}$ in the prime ideal decomposition of $(p)$ is called the branching index of $\mathfrak{p}$ over $p$. If $\mathfrak{p}|(p)$, then $\mathcal N(\mathfrak{p})=p^{f_\mathfrak{p}}$ for some $f_\mathfrak{p}\in\N$, which is called the inertia index of $\mathfrak{p}$ over $p$. For every $p\in\mathbb P$, the branching and inertia indices associated with the ideal $(p)$ satisfy the following relation with respect to the degree of $K/\mathbb Q$:

$$\sum_{\mathfrak{p}|(p)} e_\mathfrak{p} f_\mathfrak{p} = n_K.$$

Using the knowledge of the inertia indices for every $p\in\mathbb P$, the local parameters $\alpha_j(K,p)$ can now be determined, namely via the factors $(1-p^{-s f_\mathfrak{p}})^{-1}$ in the identity

$$\prod_{0\neq\mathfrak{p}\subset\mathcal O_K} \frac{1}{1-\mathcal N(\mathfrak{p})^{-s}} =
\prod_{p\in\mathbb P}\;\prod_{\mathfrak{p}|(p)} (1-p^{-s f_\mathfrak{p}})^{-1},$$

by factoring the polynomials $X^{f_\mathfrak{p}}-1$ in the polynomial ring $\Complex[X]$.

The gamma factor with respect to $L(K,s)$ is

$$\gamma(K,s)=
\pi^{-\frac{s\cdot n_K}{2}}\,
\Gamma\left(\frac{s}{2}\right)^{n_1+n_2}\,
\Gamma\left(\frac{s+1}{2}\right)^{n_2}.$$

The value of the discriminant of $K$ is the conductor of $L(K,s)$:

$$q(K)=|d_K|.$$

Thus, the complete L-function of $K$ for $\Re(s)>1$ is given by

$$\Lambda(K,s):=
q(K)^\frac{s}{2}\,\gamma(K,s)\,L(K,s)=
\left(\frac{|d_K|}{\pi^{n_K}}\right)^\frac{s}{2}\,
\Gamma\left(\frac{s}{2}\right)^{n_1+n_2}\,
\Gamma\left(\frac{s+1}{2}\right)^{n_2}\,
\sum_{0\neq\mathfrak{a}\subset\mathcal O_K} \frac{1}{\mathcal N(\mathfrak{a})^s}.$$

This function has an analytic continuation to the complex plane with simple poles at $s=0$ and $s=1$, and residues there of $-\frac{2^r h R}{w}$ and $\frac{2^r h R}{w}$, respectively. Here, $r=n_1+n_2$ is the number of infinite digits, $h\in\N$ is the class number, $R\in\R$ is the regulator of $K$, and $w\in\N$ is the number of unit roots in $K$.

Dedekind L-functions always have a root of 1:

$$\epsilon(K)=1.$$

Thus, the analytically extended, complete L-function of $K$ satisfies the functional equation

$$\Lambda(K,s)=\Lambda(K,1-s).$$

The analytically extended function $\Lambda(K,s)$ now also allows for the analytic extension of $L(K,s)$, namely via the definition

$$L(K,s):=\frac{\Lambda(K,s)}{
|d_k|^\frac{s}{2}\,\gamma(K,s)}=
\left(\frac{\pi^{n_K}}{|d_K|}\right)^\frac{s}{2}\cdot
\frac{\Lambda(K,s)}{
\Gamma\left(\frac{s}{2}\right)^{n_1+n_2}\,
\Gamma\left(\frac{s+1}{2}\right)^{n_2}}.$$

This makes $L(K,s)$ a meromorphic function on $\Complex$ with a simple pole at $s=1$. One of its fascinating properties is the so-called analytic class number formula, according to which the residue of $L(K,s)$ at $s=1$ takes the following form:

$$\operatorname{Res}_{s=1}\, L(K,s) =
\frac{2^{n_1}(2\pi)^{n_2}}{w\sqrt{|d_K|}}\,h R.$$

== Conjectural information ==
One can list characteristics of known examples of L-functions that one would wish to see generalized:

- location of zeros and poles;
- functional equation, with respect to some vertical line Re(s) = constant;
- interesting values at integers related to quantities from algebraic K-theory.

Detailed work has produced a large body of plausible conjectures, for example about the exact type of functional equation that should apply. Since the Riemann zeta function connects through its values at positive even integers (and negative odd integers) to the Bernoulli numbers, one looks for an appropriate generalisation of that phenomenon. In that case results have been obtained for p-adic L-functions, which describe certain Galois modules.

The statistics of the zero distributions are of interest because of their connection to problems like the generalized Riemann hypothesis, distribution of prime numbers, etc. The connections with random matrix theory and quantum chaos are also of interest. The fractal structure of the distributions has been studied using rescaled range analysis. The self-similarity of the zero distribution is quite remarkable, and is characterized by a large fractal dimension of 1.9. This rather large fractal dimension is found over zeros covering at least fifteen orders of magnitude for the Riemann zeta function, and also for the zeros of other L-functions of different orders and conductors.

== Birch and Swinnerton-Dyer conjecture ==
One of the influential examples, both for the history of the more general L-functions and as a still-open research problem, is the conjecture developed by Bryan Birch and Peter Swinnerton-Dyer in the early part of the 1960s. It applies to an elliptic curve E, and the problem it attempts to solve is the prediction of the rank of the elliptic curve over the rational numbers (or another global field): i.e. the number of free generators of its group of rational points. Much previous work in the area began to be unified around a better knowledge of L-functions. This was something like a paradigm example of the nascent theory of L-functions.

== Rise of the general theory ==
This development preceded the Langlands program by a few years, and can be regarded as complementary to it: Langlands' work relates largely to Artin L-functions, which, like Hecke L-functions, were defined several decades earlier, and to L-functions attached to general automorphic representations.

Gradually it became clearer in what sense the construction of Hasse–Weil zeta functions might be made to work to provide valid L-functions, in the analytic sense: there should be some input from analysis, which meant automorphic analysis. The general case now unifies at a conceptual level a number of different research programs.

== See also ==
- Generalized Riemann hypothesis
- Dirichlet L-function
- Automorphic L-function
- Modularity theorem
- Artin conjecture
- Special values of L-functions
- Explicit formulae for L-functions
- Shimizu L-function
