= Prime zeta function =

Mathematical function

In mathematics, the prime zeta function is an analogue of the Riemann zeta function, studied by Glaisher (1891). It is defined as the following infinite series, which converges for $\Re(s) > 1$:

$$P(s)=\sum_{p\,\in\mathrm{\,primes}} \frac{1}{p^s}=\frac{1}{2^s}+\frac{1}{3^s}+\frac{1}{5^s}+\frac{1}{7^s}+\frac{1}{11^s}+\dots\ .$$

== Properties ==
The Euler product for the Riemann zeta function $\zeta(s)$ implies that

$$\log\zeta(s)=\sum_{n>0} \frac{P(ns)} n ,$$

which by Möbius inversion gives

$$P(s)=\sum_{n>0} \mu(n)\frac{\log\zeta(ns)} n$$

When $s$ goes to 1, we have $\textstyle P(s) \sim \log\zeta(s)\sim\log\left(\frac{1}{s-1} \right)$. This is used in the definition of Dirichlet density.

This gives the continuation of $P(s)$ to $\Re(s) > 0$, with an infinite number of logarithmic singularities at points $s$ where $ns$ is a pole (only $ns=1$ when $n$ is a squarefree number greater than or equal to 1), or zero of the Riemann zeta function ζ(.). The line $\Re(s) = 0$ is a natural boundary as the singularities cluster near all points of this line.

If one defines a sequence

$$a_n=\prod_{p^k \mid n} \frac{1}{k}=\prod_{p^k \mid \mid n} \frac 1 {k!}$$

then

$$P(s)=\log\sum_{n=1}^\infty \frac{a_n}{n^s}.$$

(Exponentiation shows that this is equivalent to Lemma 2.7 by Li.)

The prime zeta function is related to Artin's constant by

$$\ln C_{\mathrm{Artin}} = - \sum_{n=2}^{\infty} \frac{(L_n-1)P(n)}{n}$$

where $L_n$ is the $n$th Lucas number.

Specific values are:

$s$	approximate value $P(s)$	OEIS
1	$\tfrac{1}{2} + \tfrac{1}{3} + \tfrac{1}{5} + \tfrac{1}{7} + \tfrac{1}{11} + \cdots \to \infty$	
2	$0{.}45224\text{ }74200\text{ }41065\text{ }49850 \ldots$	OEIS: A085548
3	$0{.}17476\text{ }26392\text{ }99443\text{ }53642 \ldots$	OEIS: A085541
4	$0{.}07699\text{ }31397\text{ }64246\text{ }84494 \ldots$	OEIS: A085964
5	$0{.}03575\text{ }50174\text{ }83924\text{ }25713 \ldots$	OEIS: A085965
6	$0{.}01707\text{ }00868\text{ }50636\text{ }51295 \ldots$	OEIS: A085966
7	$0{.}00828\text{ }38328\text{ }56133\text{ }59253 \ldots$	OEIS: A085967
8	$0{.}00406\text{ }14053\text{ }66517\text{ }83056 \ldots$	OEIS: A085968
9	$0{.}00200\text{ }44675\text{ }74962\text{ }45066 \ldots$	OEIS: A085969

== Analysis ==
=== Integral ===
The integral over the prime zeta function is usually anchored at infinity, because the pole at $s=1$ prohibits defining a nice lower bound at some finite integer without entering a discussion on branch cuts in the complex plane:

$$\int_s^\infty P(t) \, dt = \sum_p \frac 1 {p^s\log p}$$

The noteworthy values are again those where the sums converge slowly:

$s$	approximate value $\sum _p 1/(p^s\log p)$	OEIS
1	$1.63661632\ldots$	OEIS: A137245
2	$0.50778218\ldots$	OEIS: A221711
3	$0.22120334\ldots$	
4	$0.10266547\ldots$	

=== Derivative ===
The first derivative is

$$P'(s) \equiv \frac{d}{ds} P(s) = - \sum_p \frac{\log p}{p^s}$$

The interesting values are again those where the sums converge slowly:

$s$	approximate value $P'(s)$	OEIS
2	$-0.493091109\ldots$	OEIS: A136271
3	$-0.150757555\ldots$	OEIS: A303493
4	$-0.060607633\ldots$	OEIS: A303494
5	$-0.026838601\ldots$	OEIS: A303495

== Generalizations ==
=== Almost-prime zeta functions ===
As the Riemann zeta function is a sum of inverse powers over the integers and the prime zeta function a sum of inverse powers of the prime numbers, the $k$-primes (the integers that are a product of $k$ not necessarily distinct primes) define a sort of intermediate sums:

$$P_k(s)\equiv \sum_{n: \Omega(n)=k} \frac 1 {n^s} ,$$

where $\Omega$ is the total number of prime factors.

$k$	$s$	approximate value $P_k(s)$	OEIS
2	2	$0.14076043434\ldots$	OEIS: A117543
2	3	$0.02380603347\ldots$	
3	2	$0.03851619298\ldots$	OEIS: A131653
3	3	$0.00304936208\ldots$	

Each integer in the denominator of the Riemann zeta function $\zeta$ may be classified by its value of the index $k$, which decomposes the Riemann zeta function into an infinite sum of the $P_k$:

$$\zeta(s) = 1+\sum_{k=1,2,\ldots} P_k(s)$$

Since we know that the Dirichlet series (in some formal parameter $u$) satisfies

$$P_{\Omega}(u, s) := \sum_{n \geq 1} \frac{u^{\Omega(n)}}{n^s} = \prod_{p \in \mathbb{P}} \left(1-up^{-s}\right)^{-1},$$

we can use formulas for the symmetric polynomial variants with a generating function of the right-hand-side type. Namely, we have the coefficient-wise identity that $P_k(s) = [u^k] P_{\Omega}(u, s) = h(x_1, x_2, x_3, \ldots)$ when the sequences correspond to $x_j := j^{-s} \chi_{\mathbb{P}}(j)$ where $\chi_{\mathbb{P}}$ denotes the characteristic function of the primes. Using Newton's identities, we have a general formula for these sums given by

$$P_n(s) = \sum_{{k_1+2k_2+\cdots+nk_n=n} \atop {k_1,\ldots,k_n \geq 0}} \left[\prod_{i=1}^n \frac{P(is)^{k_i}}{k_i! \cdot i^{k_i}}\right] = -[z^n]\log\left(1 - \sum_{j \geq 1} \frac{P(js) z^j}{j}\right).$$

Special cases include the following explicit expansions:

$$\begin{align}P_1(s) & = P(s) \\ P_2(s) & = \frac{1}{2}\left(P(s)^2+P(2s)\right) \\ P_3(s) & = \frac{1}{6}\left(P(s)^3+3P(s)P(2s)+2P(3s)\right) \\ P_4(s) & = \frac{1}{24}\left(P(s)^4+6P(s)^2 P(2s)+3 P(2s)^2+8P(s)P(3s)+6P(4s)\right).\end{align}$$

=== Prime modulo zeta functions ===
Constructing the sum not over all primes but only over primes that are in the same modulo class introduces further types of infinite series that are a reduction of the Dirichlet L-function.

== See also ==
- Divergence of the sum of the reciprocals of the primes
