= Generalized Riemann hypothesis =

Mathematical conjecture about zeros of L-functions

The Riemann hypothesis is one of the most important conjectures in mathematics. It is a statement about the zeros of the Riemann zeta function. Various geometrical and arithmetical objects can be described by so-called global L-functions, which are formally similar to the Riemann zeta-function. One can then ask the same question about the zeros of these L-functions, yielding various generalizations of the Riemann hypothesis. Many mathematicians believe these generalizations of the Riemann hypothesis to be true. The only cases of these conjectures which have been proven occur in the algebraic function field case (not the number field case).

Global L-functions can be associated to elliptic curves, number fields (in which case they are called Dedekind zeta-functions), Maass forms, and Dirichlet characters (in which case they are called Dirichlet L-functions). When the Riemann hypothesis is formulated for Dedekind zeta-functions, it is known as the extended Riemann hypothesis (ERH) and when it is formulated for Dirichlet L-functions, it is known as the generalized Riemann hypothesis (GRH). Another approach to generalization of Riemann hypothesis was given by Atle Selberg and his introduction of class of function satisfying certain properties rather than specific functions, nowadays known as Selberg class. These three statements will be discussed in more detail below. (Many mathematicians use the label generalized Riemann hypothesis to cover the extension of the Riemann hypothesis to all global L-functions, not only the special case of Dirichlet L-functions.)

On November 20, 2026, mathematician Levent Alpöge proposed an AI-assisted proof of the generalized Riemann hypothesis. The result has been stated as verified by the independent Lean and Mathlib mathematical communities and endorsed by the Lean FRO and the Mathlib Initiative, in a joint statement. Furthermore, Andrew Sutherland from MIT and Simon DeDeo from Carnegie Mellon University checked the proof and found it correct.

== Generalized Riemann hypothesis ==
The Generalized Riemann hypothesis asserts that all nontrivial zeros of Dirichlet L-function $L(\chi,s)$ for primitive Dirichlet character $\chi$ have real part $\frac{1}{2}$.

The generalized Riemann hypothesis for Dirichlet L-functions was probably formulated for the first time by Adolf Piltz in 1884. It is important to assume primitivity of the character, since for nonprimitive characters, L-functions have infinitely many zeros off this line and do not satisfy the functional equation that is used to distinguish between trivial and nontrivial zeros.

=== Background ===
A Dirichlet character $\chi:\mathbb{Z}\rightarrow \mathbb{C}$ of modulus q is an arithmetic function that is:

- completely multiplicative: $\chi(a\cdot b)=\chi(a)\cdot\chi(b)$
- periodic: $\chi(n+q)=\chi(n)$
- $\chi(n)=0$ if and only if $\gcd(n, q) > 1$.

For such a character $\chi$, we define the corresponding Dirichlet L-function by:
$$L(\chi,s) = \sum_{n=1}^\infty \frac{\chi(n)}{n^s}$$
For every complex number s such that Re s > 1 this series is absolutely convergent. By analytic continuation, this function can be extended to a meromorphic function on the complex plane having only a possible pole in $s=1$, when the character is principal (has only 1 as value for numbers coprime to k). For nonprincipal characters, the series is conditionally convergent for $\operatorname{Re}(s)>0$ and the analytic continuation is an entire function.

We say that the Dirichlet character $\chi$ is imprimitive if it is induced by another Dirichlet character $\chi^\star$ of lesser modulus:
$$\chi(n) =
\begin{cases}
\chi^\star(n), & \mathrm{if} \gcd(n,q) = 1 \\
0, & \mathrm{if} \gcd(n,q) \ne 1
\end{cases}$$
Otherwise we say that the character is primitive. Generally most statements for Dirichlet L-functions are easier to express for versions with primitive characters. Using Euler products of Dirichlet L-functions, we can express the L-function of an imprimitive character $\chi$ as a function of the character $\chi^\star$ that induces it:
$$L(s,\chi) = L(s,\chi^\star) \prod_{p \,|\, q}\left(1 - \frac{\chi^\star(p)}{p^s} \right)$$
From the factors in this equation we have infinitely many zeros on the line $\operatorname{Re}(s)=0$. For primitive Dirichlet character, the L-function satisfies a certain functional equation which allows us to define trivial zeros of $L(s,\chi)$ as zeros corresponding to poles of the gamma function in this equation:

- If $\chi(-1)=1$, then all trivial zeros are simple zeros in negative even numbers. If $L(s,\chi)\neq \zeta(s)$ it also includes 0.
- If $\chi(-1)=-1$ then all trivial zeros are simple zeros in negative odd numbers.

Any other zeros are called nontrivial zeros. The functional equation guarantees that nontrivial zeros lie in the critical strip $0 < \operatorname{Re}(s) < 1$ and are symmetric with respect to the critical line $\operatorname{Re}(s) = \tfrac{1}{2}$. The Generalized Riemann Hypothesis says that all nontrivial zeros lie exactly on this line.

=== Consequences of GRH ===
Like the original Riemann hypothesis, the GRH has far-reaching consequences about the distribution of prime numbers:

- Taking the trivial character $\chi(n)=1$ yields the ordinary Riemann hypothesis.
- More effective version of Dirichlet's theorem on arithmetic progressions: Let $\pi(x,a,d)$ where a and d are coprime denote the number of prime numbers in arithmetic progression $n\cdot d + a$ which are less than or equal to x. If the generalized Riemann hypothesis is true, then for every ε > 0:
  $$\pi(x,a,d) = \frac{\operatorname{Li}(x)}{\varphi(d)} + O(x^{1/2+\varepsilon})\quad\mbox{ as } \ x\to\infty,$$
  where $\varphi$ is Euler's totient function, $\operatorname{Li}(x) = \int_2^x \frac{1}{\ln t}\,dt$ is the Logarithmic Integral, and $O$ is the Big O notation. This is a considerable strengthening of the prime number theorem.
- Every proper subgroup of the multiplicative group $(\mathbb Z/n\mathbb Z)^\times$ omits a number less than $2\ln(n)^2$, as well as a number coprime to $n$ less than $3\ln(n)^2$. This has many consequences in computational number theory:
  - In 1976, G. Miller showed that the Miller-Rabin test is guaranteed to run in polynomial time. In 2002, Manindra Agrawal, Neeraj Kayal and Nitin Saxena proved unconditionally that the AKS primality test is guaranteed to run in polynomial time.
  - The Shanks–Tonelli algorithm is guaranteed to run in polynomial time.
  - The Ivanyos–Karpinski–Saxena deterministic algorithm for factoring polynomials over finite fields with prime constant-smooth degrees is guaranteed to run in polynomial time.
- For every prime p there exists a primitive root mod p (a generator of the multiplicative group of integers modulo p) that is less than $O((\ln p)^6).$
- Estimate of the character sum in the Pólya–Vinogradov inequality can be improved to $O\left(\sqrt{q}\log\log q\right)$, q being the modulus of the character.
- In 1913, Grönwall showed that the generalized Riemann hypothesis implies that Gauss's list of imaginary quadratic fields with class number 1 is complete, though Baker, Stark and Heegner later gave unconditional proofs of this without using the generalized Riemann hypothesis.
- In 1917, Hardy and Littlewood showed that the generalized Riemann hypothesis implies a conjecture of Chebyshev that
  $$\lim_{x\to 1^-} \sum_{p>2}(-1)^{(p+1)/2} x^p=+\infty$$
  (where the sum extends over all odd primes p). This says that primes 3 mod 4 are more common than primes 1 mod 4 in some sense. (For related results, see Prime number theorem § Prime number race.)
- In 1923, Hardy and Littlewood showed that the generalized Riemann hypothesis implies Goldbach weak conjecture for sufficiently large odd numbers. In 1997 Deshouillers, Effinger, te Riele, and Zinoviev showed that actually 5 is sufficiently large, so GRH implies weak Goldbach conjecture. In 1937 Vinogradov gave an unconditional proof for sufficiently large odd numbers. The yet to be verified proof of Harald Helfgott improved Vinogradov's method by verifying GRH for several thousand small characters up to a certain imaginary part to prove the conjecture for all integers above 10^{29}, integers below which have already been verified by calculation.
- In 1934, Chowla showed that the generalized Riemann hypothesis implies that the first prime in the arithmetic progression a mod m is at most $Km^2\log(m)^2$ for some fixed constant K.
- In 1967, Hooley showed that the generalized Riemann hypothesis implies Artin's conjecture on primitive roots.
- In 1973, Weinberger showed that the generalized Riemann hypothesis implies that Euler's list of idoneal numbers is complete.
- Ono & Soundararajan (1997) showed that the generalized Riemann hypothesis implies that Ramanujan's integral quadratic form x^{2} + y^{2} + 10z^{2} represents all integers that it represents locally, with exactly 18 exceptions.

== Extended Riemann hypothesis ==
Suppose $K$ is a number field with ring of integers $O_{K}$ (this ring is the integral closure of the integers $\mathbb Z$ in K). If $I$ is a nonzero ideal of $O_{K}$, we denote its norm by $N(I)$. The Dedekind zeta-function of K is then defined by
$$\zeta_K(s) = \sum_{I\subseteq O_K} \frac{1}{N(I)^s}$$
for every complex number s with real part > 1. The sum extends over all non-zero ideals $I$ of $O_{K}$. That function can be extended by analytic continuation to a meromorphic function on the complex plane with a possible pole at $s=1$ which satisfies a functional equation providing exact locations of trivial zeroes and guaranteeing that nontrivial zeros lie inside the critical strip $0 \leq \operatorname{Re}(s) \leq 1$ and are symmetric with respect to the critical line: $\operatorname{Re}(s)=\tfrac{1}{2}$.

The extended Riemann hypothesis asserts that for every number field K each nontrivial zero of $\zeta_K$ has real part $\tfrac{1}{2}$ (and thus lies on the critical line).

=== Consequences of ERH ===
- This version of Riemann Hypothesis actually covers a broader class of L-functions than Dedekind zeta functions themselves:
  - Since for an abelian extension of number fields $L/K$ the quotient of their Dedekind zeta functions can be expressed as a product of Hecke L-functions for nontrivial ray class Hecke characters of field $K$ and Hecke L-functions for nontrivial characters are entire, all nontrivial zeros of these functions must lie on $\operatorname{Re}(s)=\tfrac{1}{2}$. Moreover, for every ray class character of $K$ there exists some abelian extension $L$, where its L-function appears in such factorization, thus ERH implies the Riemann Hypothesis for Hecke L-functions of ray class characters (for trivial ray class characters Hecke L-functions are Dedekind zeta functions).
  - Using Brauer's theorem on induced characters it can be shown that each Artin L-function can be expressed as a product of Hecke L-functions (for ray class characters) raised to integer powers. Then ERH implies that all nontrivial zeros and poles of Artin L-function lie on $\operatorname{Re}(s)=\tfrac{1}{2}$. The nonexistence of such nontrivial poles is a subject of the separate Artin holomorphy conjecture.
- Because Dirichlet L-functions are Hecke L-functions for ray class characters of $\mathbb{Q}$, GRH follows from ERH.
- In 2021, Alexander (Alex) Dunn and Maksym Radziwill proved Patterson's conjecture on cubic Gauss sums, under the assumption of the Riemann Hypothesis for Hecke L-functions of $\mathbb{Q}(\zeta_3)$, where $\zeta_3$ is primitive cubic root of unity.
- The ERH implies an effective version of the Chebotarev density theorem: if L/K is a finite Galois extension with Galois group G, and C a union of conjugacy classes of G, the number of unramified primes of K of norm below x with Frobenius conjugacy class in C is
  $$\frac{|C|}{|G|}\Bigl(\operatorname{Li}(x)+O\bigl(\sqrt x(n\log x+\log|\Delta|)\bigr)\Bigr),$$
  where the constant implied in the big-O notation is absolute, n is the degree of L over Q, and Δ its discriminant.
- Weinberger (1973) showed that ERH implies that any number field with class number 1 is either Euclidean or an imaginary quadratic number field of discriminant −19, −43, −67, or −163.
- Odlyzko (1990) discussed how the ERH can be used to give sharper estimates for discriminants and class numbers of number fields.
- Hooley (1967) published a proof that the ERH for a certain restricted class of number fields $K$ implies Artin's conjecture on primitive roots.

== Generalized Riemann hypothesis for the Selberg class ==
The Selberg class is defined the following way:

We say that the Dirichlet series $F(s)=\sum_{n=1}^{\infty}\frac{a_n}{n^s}$ is in the Selberg class if it satisfies the following properties:

- Analyticity: $F(s)$ has a meromorphic continuation to the entire complex plane, with the only possible pole (if any) in $s=1$.
- Ramanujan conjecture: a_{1} = 1 and $a_n \ll_\varepsilon n^\varepsilon$ for any ε > 0.
- Functional equation: there is a gamma factor of the form
  $$\gamma(s)=Q^s\prod_{i=1}^k \Gamma (\omega_is+\mu_i)$$
  where $Q$ is real and positive, $\Gamma$ is the gamma function, each $\omega_i$ is real and positive, and each $\mu_i$ is complex with a non-negative real part, as well as a so-called root number: $\alpha\in\mathbb C,\;|\alpha|=1$, such that the function:
  $$\Phi(s) = \gamma(s) F(s)\,$$
  satisfies:
  $$\Phi(s)=\alpha\,\overline{\Phi(1-\overline{s})}$$.
- Euler product: For Re(s) > 1, F(s) can be written as a product over primes:
  $$F(s)=\prod_p F_p(s)$$
  with
  $$F_p(s)=\exp\left(\sum_{n=1}^\infty\frac{b_{p^n}}{p^{ns}}\right)$$
  and, for some $\theta < \tfrac{1}{2}$,
  $$b_{p^n}=O(p^{n\theta}).$$

From analyticity follows that the poles of the gamma factor in $\operatorname{Re}(s)<1$ must be cancelled by zeros of $F(s)$; these zeros are called trivial zeros. Functional equation guarantees that all nontrivial zeros lie in the critical strip $0< \operatorname{Re}(s)<1$ and are symmetric with respect to the critical line $\operatorname{Re}(s)=\tfrac{1}{2}$.

The generalized Riemann hypothesis for the Selberg class states that all nontrivial zeros of function $F$ belonging to the Selberg class have real part $\tfrac{1}{2}$ and then lie on critical line.

The Selberg class, along with the proposition of the Riemann hypothesis for it, was first introduced in (Selberg 1992). Instead of considering specific functions, Selberg's approach was to give an axiomatic definition consisting of properties characterizing most objects called L-functions or zeta functions and expected to satisfy counterparts or generalizations of the Riemann hypothesis.

=== Consequences ===
- Conjecturally, the Selberg class should be equal to the class of automorphic L-functions and the Riemann hypothesis for the Selberg class should be equivalent to the grand Riemann hypothesis.
- Dedekind zeta functions and Hecke L-functions for ray class characters belong to the Selberg class, then the Riemann hypothesis for Selberg class implies ERH.
- The Riemann hypothesis for the Selberg class concerns much more general L-functions than Hecke L-functions. Another known class of examples of functions in the Selberg class are L-functions related to modular forms. The archetypical example is Ramanujan's L-function that arises as a Mellin transformation of a modular form, but requires translation by $\tfrac{11}{2}$ to satisfy the coefficients growth condition (growth of original coefficients is strictly related to the weight of modular form by the Ramanujan-Petersson conjecture, now proven for modular forms).

== See also ==
- Artin's conjecture
- Artin L-function
- Dirichlet L-function
- Dedekind zeta function
- Selberg class
- Grand Riemann hypothesis
