= Monogenic field =

In mathematics, a monogenic field is an algebraic number field K for which there exists an element a such that the ring of integers O_{K} is the subring Z[a] of K generated by a. Then O_{K} is a quotient of the polynomial ring Z[X] and the powers of a constitute a power integral basis.

In a monogenic field K, the field discriminant of K is equal to the discriminant of the minimal polynomial of α.

== Examples ==
Examples of monogenic fields include:

- Quadratic fields:

if $K = \mathbf{Q}(\sqrt d)$ with $d$ a square-free integer, then $O_K = \mathbf{Z}[a]$ where $a = (1+\sqrt d)/2$ if d ≡ 1 (mod 4) and $a = \sqrt d$ if d ≡ 2 or 3 (mod 4).

- Cyclotomic fields:

if $K = \mathbf{Q}(\zeta)$ with $\zeta$ a root of unity, then $O_K = \mathbf{Z}[\zeta].$ Also the maximal real subfield $\mathbf{Q}(\zeta)^{+} = \mathbf{Q}(\zeta + \zeta^{-1})$ is monogenic, with ring of integers $\mathbf{Z}[\zeta+\zeta^{-1}]$.

While all quadratic fields are monogenic, already among cubic fields there are many that are not monogenic. The first example of a non-monogenic number field that was found is the cubic field generated by a root of the polynomial $X^3 - X^2 - 2X - 8$, due to Richard Dedekind.
