= Hecke L-function =

In mathematics, a Hecke L-function may refer to:

- an L-function of a modular form
- an L-function of a Hecke character
