= Dirichlet L-function =

Type of mathematical function

In mathematics, a Dirichlet L-series is a function of the form

$$L(s,\chi) = \sum_{n=1}^\infty \frac{\chi(n)}{n^s},$$

where $\chi$ is a Dirichlet character and $s$ is a complex variable with real part greater than $1$. It is a special case of a Dirichlet series. By analytic continuation, it can be extended to a meromorphic function on the whole complex plane; it is then called a Dirichlet L-function.

These functions are named after Peter Gustav Lejeune Dirichlet who introduced them in 1837 to prove his theorem on primes in arithmetic progressions. In his proof, Dirichlet showed that $L(s,\chi)$ is non-zero at $s = 1$. Moreover, if $\chi$ is principal, then the corresponding Dirichlet L-function has a simple pole at $s = 1$. Otherwise, the L-function is entire.

== Euler product ==
Since a Dirichlet character $\chi$ is completely multiplicative, its L-function can also be written as an Euler product in the half-plane of absolute convergence:
$$L(s,\chi)=\prod_p\left(1-\chi(p)p^{-s}\right)^{-1}\text{ for }\text{Re}(s) > 1,$$
where the product is over all prime numbers.

== Primitive characters ==
Results about L-functions are often stated more simply if the character is assumed to be primitive, although the results typically can be extended to imprimitive characters with minor complications. This is because of the relationship between a imprimitive character $\chi$ and the primitive character $\chi^\star$ which induces it:
$$\chi(n) =
\begin{cases}
\chi^\star(n) & \mathrm{if} \gcd(n,q) = 1, \\
\;\;\;0 & \mathrm{otherwise}.
\end{cases}$$
(Here, $q$ is the modulus of $\chi$.) An application of the Euler product gives a simple relationship between the corresponding L-functions:
$$L(s,\chi) = L(s,\chi^\star) \prod_{p \,|\, q}\left(1 - \frac{\chi^\star(p)}{p^s} \right).$$
By analytic continuation, this formula holds for all complex $s$, even though the Euler product is only valid when $\operatorname{Re}(s)>1$. The formula shows that the L-function of $\chi$ is equal to the L-function of the primitive character which induces $\chi$, multiplied by only a finite number of factors.

As a special case, the L-function of the principal character $\chi_0$ modulo $q$ can be expressed in terms of the Riemann zeta function:
$$L(s,\chi_0) = \zeta(s) \prod_{p \,|\, q}(1 - p^{-s}).$$

== Functional equation ==
Dirichlet L-functions satisfy a functional equation, which provides a way to analytically continue them throughout the complex plane. The functional equation relates the values of $L(s,\chi)$ to the values of $L(1-s, \overline{\chi})$.

Let $\chi$ be a primitive character modulo $q$, where $q>1$. One way to express the functional equation is as
$$L(s,\chi) = W(\chi) 2^s \pi^{s-1} q^{1/2-s} \sin \left( \frac{\pi}{2} (s + \delta) \right)  \Gamma(1-s) L(1-s, \overline{\chi}),$$
where $\Gamma$ is the gamma function, $\delta\in\{0,1\}$ such that $\chi(-1)=(-1)^{\delta}$, and
$$W(\chi) = \frac{\tau(\chi)}{i^{\delta}\sqrt{q}},$$
where $\tau(\chi)$ is the Gauss sum
$$\tau(\chi) = \sum_{a=1}^q \chi(a)\exp(2\pi ia/q).$$
It is a property of Gauss sums that $|\tau(\chi)| = \sqrt{q}$, so $|W(\chi)| = 1$. Another functional equation is
$$\Lambda(s,\chi) = q ^{s/2} \pi^{-(s+\delta)/2} \operatorname{\Gamma}\left(\frac{s+\delta}{2}\right) L(s,\chi),$$
which can be expressed as
$$\Lambda(s,\chi) = W(\chi) \Lambda(1-s,\overline{\chi}).$$

This implies that $L(s,\chi)$ and $\Lambda(s,\chi)$ are entire functions of $s$. Again, this assumes that $\chi$ is primitive character modulo $q$ with $q>1$. If $q=1$, then $L(s,\chi) = \zeta(s)$ has a pole at $s=1$.

For generalizations, see the article on functional equations of L-functions.

== Zeros ==
The Dirichlet L-function L(s, χ) = 1 − 3^{−s} + 5^{−s} − 7^{−s} + ⋅⋅⋅ (sometimes given the special name Dirichlet beta function), with trivial zeros at the negative odd integers

Let $\chi$ be a primitive character modulo $q$, with $q>1$.

There are no zeros of $L(s,\chi)$ with $\operatorname{Re}(s)>1$. For $\operatorname{Re}(s) < 0$, there are zeros at certain negative integers $s$:

- If $\chi(-1) = 1$, the only zeros of $L(s,\chi)$ with $\operatorname{Re}(s) < 0$ are simple zeros at $-2,-4,-6,\dots$ There is also a zero at $s = 0$ when $\chi$ is non-principal. These correspond to the poles of $\textstyle \Gamma(\frac{s}{2})$.
- If $\chi(-1) = -1$, then the only zeros of $L(s,\chi)$ with $\operatorname{Re}(s) < 0$ are simple zeros at $-1,-3,-5,\dots$ These correspond to the poles of $\textstyle \Gamma(\frac{s+1}{2})$.

These are called the trivial zeros.

The remaining zeros lie in the critical strip $0 \leq \operatorname{Re}(s) \leq 1$, and are called the non-trivial zeros. The non-trivial zeros are symmetrical about the critical line $\operatorname{Re}(s) = 1/2$. That is, if $L(\rho,\chi)=0$, then $L(1-\overline{\rho},\chi)=0$ too because of the functional equation. If $\chi$ is a real character, then the non-trivial zeros are also symmetrical about the real axis, but not if $\chi$ is a complex character. The generalized Riemann hypothesis is the conjecture that all the non-trivial zeros lie on the critical line $\operatorname{Re}(s) = 1/2$.

Up to the possible existence of a Siegel zero, zero-free regions including and beyond the line $\operatorname{Re}(s) = 1$ similar to that of the Riemann zeta function are known to exist for all Dirichlet L-functions: for example, for $\chi$ a non-real character of modulus $q$, we have

$$\beta < 1 - \frac{c}{\log\!\!\; \big(q(2+|\gamma|)\big)} \$$

for $\beta + i\gamma$ a non-real zero. On 6 October, 2026, OpenAI posted an AI-generated preprint, together with a Lean formalization, claiming the zero-free half-plane $\text{Re}(s) > 7/8$ for all Dirichlet L-functions, which has since been improved by independent researchers. While this includes the non-existence of Siegel zeros, the separate claim was covered in its own nine page preprint, which independent researchers have shortened and/or made more readable.

== Relation to the Hurwitz zeta function ==
Dirichlet L-functions may be written as linear combinations of the Hurwitz zeta function at rational values. Fixing an integer $k \geq 1$, Dirichlet L-functions for characters modulo $k$ are linear combinations with constant coefficients of the $\zeta(s,a)$ where $a = r/k$ and $r = 1,2,\dots,k$. This means that the Hurwitz zeta function for rational $a$ has analytic properties that are closely related to the Dirichlet L-functions. Specifically, if $\chi$ is a character modulo $k$, we can write its Dirichlet L-function as

$$L(s,\chi) = \sum_{n=1}^\infty \frac{\chi(n)}{n^s}
= \frac{1}{k^s} \sum_{r=1}^k \chi(r) \operatorname{\zeta}\left(s,\frac{r}{k}\right).$$

== See also ==
- Generalized Riemann hypothesis
- L-function
- Modularity theorem
- Artin conjecture
- Special values of L-functions
