= Euler product =

Infinite products of functions indexed by primes

In number theory, an Euler product is an expansion of a Dirichlet series into an infinite product indexed by prime numbers. The original such product was given for the sum of all positive integers raised to a certain power as proven by Leonhard Euler. This series and its continuation to the entire complex plane would later become known as the Riemann zeta function.

== Definition ==
In general, if a is a bounded multiplicative function, then the Dirichlet series

$$\sum_{n=1}^\infty \frac{a(n)}{n^s}$$

is equal to

$$\prod_{p\in\mathbb{P}} P(p, s) \quad \text{for } \operatorname{Re}(s) >1 .$$

where the product is taken over prime numbers p, and P(p, s) is the sum

$$\sum_{k=0}^\infty \frac{a(p^k)}{p^{ks}} = 1 + \frac{a(p)}{p^s} + \frac{a(p^2)}{p^{2s}} + \frac{a(p^3)}{p^{3s}} + \cdots$$

In fact, if we consider these as formal generating functions, the existence of such a formal Euler product expansion is a necessary and sufficient condition that a(n) be multiplicative: this says exactly that a(n) is the product of the a(p^{k}) whenever n factors as the product of the powers p^{k} of distinct primes p.

An important special case is that in which a(n) is totally multiplicative, so that P(p, s) is a geometric series. Then

$$P(p, s)=\frac{1}{1-\frac{a(p)}{p^s}},$$

as is the case for the Riemann zeta function, where a(n) = 1, and more generally for Dirichlet characters.

== Convergence ==
In practice all the important cases are such that the infinite series and infinite product expansions are absolutely convergent in some region

$$\operatorname{Re}(s) > C,$$

that is, in some right half-plane in the complex numbers. This already gives some information, since the infinite product, to converge, must give a non-zero value; hence the function given by the infinite series is not zero in such a half-plane.

In the theory of modular forms it is typical to have Euler products with quadratic polynomials in the denominator here. The general Langlands philosophy includes a comparable explanation of the connection of polynomials of degree m, and the representation theory for GL_{m}.

== Examples ==
The following examples will use the notation $\mathbb{P}$ for the set of all primes, that is:

$$\mathbb{P}=\{p \in \mathbb{N}\mid p\text{ is prime}\}.$$

The Euler product attached to the Riemann zeta function ζ(s), also using the sum of the geometric series, is

$$\begin{align}
\prod_{p\, \in\, \mathbb{P}} \left(\frac{1}{1-\frac{1}{p^s}}\right) &= \prod_{p\ \in\ \mathbb{P}} \left(\sum_{k=0}^\infty \frac{1}{p^{ks}}\right) \\
&= \sum_{n=1}^\infty \frac{1}{n^s} = \zeta(s).
\end{align}$$

while for the Liouville function λ(n) = (−1)^{Ω(n)}, it is

$$\prod_{p\, \in\, \mathbb{P}} \left(\frac{1}{1+\frac{1}{p^s}}\right) = \sum_{n=1}^{\infty} \frac{\lambda(n)}{n^{s}} = \frac{\zeta(2s)}{\zeta(s)}.$$

Using their reciprocals, two Euler products for the Möbius function μ(n) are

$$\prod_{p\, \in\, \mathbb{P}} \left(1-\frac{1}{p^s}\right) = \sum_{n=1}^{\infty} \frac{\mu (n)}{n^{s}} = \frac{1}{\zeta(s)}$$

and

$$\prod_{p\, \in\, \mathbb{P}} \left(1+\frac{1}{p^s}\right) = \sum_{n=1}^{\infty} \frac{|\mu(n)|}{n^{s}} = \frac{\zeta(s)}{\zeta(2s)}.$$

Taking the ratio of these two gives

$$\prod_{p\, \in\, \mathbb{P}} \left(\frac{1+\frac{1}{p^s}}{1-\frac{1}{p^s}}\right) = \prod_{p\, \in\, \mathbb{P}} \left(\frac{p^s+1}{p^s-1}\right) = \frac{\zeta(s)^2}{\zeta(2s)}.$$

Since for even values of s the Riemann zeta function ζ(s) has an analytic expression in terms of a rational multiple of π^{s}, then for even exponents, this infinite product evaluates to a rational number. For example, since ζ(2) = π^{2}/6, ζ(4) = π^{4}/90, and ζ(8) = π^{8}/9450, then

$$\begin{align}
\prod_{p\, \in\, \mathbb{P}} \left(\frac{p^2+1}{p^2-1}\right) &= \frac53 \cdot \frac{10}{8} \cdot \frac{26}{24} \cdot \frac{50}{48} \cdot \frac{122}{120} \cdots &= \frac{\zeta(2)^2}{\zeta(4)} &= \frac52, \\[6pt]
\prod_{p\, \in\, \mathbb{P}} \left(\frac{p^4+1}{p^4-1}\right) &= \frac{17}{15} \cdot \frac{82}{80} \cdot \frac{626}{624} \cdot \frac{2402}{2400} \cdots &= \frac{\zeta(4)^2}{\zeta(8)} &= \frac76,
\end{align}$$

and so on, with the first result known by Ramanujan. This family of infinite products is also equivalent to

$$\prod_{p\, \in\, \mathbb{P}} \left(1+\frac{2}{p^s}+\frac{2}{p^{2s}}+\cdots\right) = \sum_{n=1}^\infty \frac{2^{\omega(n)}}{n^s} = \frac{\zeta(s)^2}{\zeta(2s)},$$

where ω(n) counts the number of distinct prime factors of n, and 2^{ω(n)} is the number of square-free divisors.

If χ(n) is a Dirichlet character of conductor N, so that χ is totally multiplicative and χ(n) only depends on n mod N, and χ(n) = 0 if n is not coprime to N, then

$$\prod_{p\, \in\, \mathbb{P}} \frac{1}{1- \frac{\chi(p)}{p^s}} = \sum_{n=1}^\infty \frac{\chi(n)}{n^s}.$$

Here it is convenient to omit the primes p dividing the conductor N from the product.

== Notable constants ==
Many well known constants have Euler product expansions.

The Leibniz formula for π

$$\frac{\pi}{4} = \sum_{n=0}^\infty \frac{(-1)^n}{2n+1} = 1 - \frac13 + \frac15 - \frac17 + \cdots$$

can be interpreted as a Dirichlet series using the (unique) Dirichlet character modulo 4, and converted to an Euler product of superparticular ratios (fractions where numerator and denominator differ by 1):

$$\frac{\pi}{4} = \left(\prod_{p\equiv 1\pmod 4}\frac{p}{p-1}\right)\left( \prod_{p\equiv 3\pmod 4}\frac{p}{p+1}\right)=\frac34 \cdot \frac54 \cdot \frac78 \cdot \frac{11}{12} \cdot \frac{13}{12} \cdots,$$

where each numerator is a prime number and each denominator is the nearest multiple of 4.

Dividing the Euler product for $\zeta(2)=\frac{\pi^2}{6}$ by the previous product, known as Basel problem, one finds that

$$\frac{\pi}{2} = \left(\prod_{p\equiv 1\pmod 4}\frac{p}{p+1}\right)\left( \prod_{p\equiv 3\pmod 4}\frac{p}{p-1}\right).$$

Taking the ratio of the previous two products gives

$$2 = \left(\prod_{p\equiv 1\pmod 4}\frac{p-1}{p+1}\right)\left( \prod_{p\equiv 3\pmod 4}\frac{p+1}{p-1}\right).$$

The infinite products must be taken in order of increasing primes.

Other Euler products for known constants include:

- The Hardy–Littlewood twin prime constant:

$$\prod_{p>2} \left(1 - \frac{1}{\left(p-1\right)^2}\right) = 0.660161\ldots$$

- The Landau–Ramanujan constant:

$$\begin{align}
\frac{\pi}{4} \prod_{p \equiv 1\pmod 4} \left(1 - \frac{1}{p^2}\right)^\frac12 &= 0.764223\ldots \\[6pt]
\frac{1}{\sqrt{2}} \prod_{p \equiv 3\pmod 4} \left(1 - \frac{1}{p^2}\right)^{-\frac12} &= 0.764223\ldots
\end{align}$$

- Murata's constant (sequence A065485 in the OEIS):

$$\prod_p \left(1 + \frac{1}{\left(p-1\right)^2}\right) = 2.826419\ldots$$

- The strongly carefree constant ×ζ(2)^{2} OEIS: A065472:

$$\prod_{p} \left(1 - \frac{1}{\left(p+1\right)^2}\right) = 0.775883\ldots$$

- Artin's constant OEIS: A005596:

$$\prod_p \left(1 - \frac{1}{p(p-1)}\right) = 0.373955\ldots$$

- Landau's totient constant OEIS: A082695:

$$\prod_p \left(1 + \frac{1}{p(p-1)}\right) = \frac{315}{2\pi^4}\zeta(3) = 1.943596\ldots$$

- The carefree constant ×ζ(2) OEIS: A065463:

$$\prod_p \left(1 - \frac{1}{p(p+1)}\right) = 0.704442\ldots$$

and its reciprocal OEIS: A065489:

$$\prod_p \left(1 + \frac{1}{p^2+p-1}\right) = 1.419562\ldots$$

- The Feller–Tornier constant OEIS: A065493:

$$\frac{1}{2}+\frac{1}{2} \prod_p \left(1 - \frac{2}{p^2}\right) = 0.661317\ldots$$

- The quadratic class number constant OEIS: A065465:

$$\prod_p \left(1 - \frac{1}{p^2(p+1)}\right) = 0.881513\ldots$$

- The totient summatory constant OEIS: A065483:

$$\prod_p \left(1 + \frac{1}{p^2(p-1)}\right) = 1.339784\ldots$$

- Sarnak's constant OEIS: A065476:

$$\prod_{p>2} \left(1 - \frac{p+2}{p^3}\right) = 0.723648\ldots$$

- The carefree constant OEIS: A065464:

$$\prod_{p} \left(1 - \frac{2p-1}{p^3}\right) = 0.428249\ldots$$

- The strongly carefree constant OEIS: A065473:

$$\prod_p \left(1 - \frac{3p-2}{p^3}\right) = 0.286747\ldots$$

- Stephens' constant OEIS: A065478:

$$\prod_p \left(1 - \frac{p}{p^3-1}\right) = 0.575959\ldots$$

- Barban's constant OEIS: A175640:

$$\prod_p \left(1 + \frac{3p^2-1}{p(p+1)\left(p^2-1\right)}\right) = 2.596536\ldots$$

- Taniguchi's constant OEIS: A175639:

$$\prod_p \left(1 - \frac{3}{p^3}+\frac{2}{p^4}+\frac{1}{p^5}-\frac{1}{p^6}\right) = 0.678234\ldots$$

- The Heath-Brown and Moroz constant OEIS: A118228:

$$\prod_p \left(1 - \frac{1}{p}\right)^7 \left(1 + \frac{7p+1}{p^2}\right) = 0.0013176\ldots$$

== See also ==
- Partial Euler Product
