= Principalization (algebra) =

When an idea extends to a principal ideal in an extension of algebraic number fields

In algebraic number theory, the concept of principalization (also called capitulation) refers to the phenomenon where an ideal (or more generally a fractional ideal) of the ring of integers of a number field, which is not principal in that field, becomes principal after extension to the ring of integers of a larger algebraic number field.

The study of principalization originates in the work of Ernst Kummer in the 1840s on ideal numbers. Kummer showed that for every algebraic number field there exists an extension in which all ideals of its ring of integers (which can always be generated by at most two elements) become principal.

In 1897, David Hilbert conjectured that the Hilbert class field (the maximal abelian extension of a number field that is unramified everywhere) provides such an extension. This statement, now known as the principal ideal theorem, was proved in 1930 by Philipp Furtwängler, following its reformulation by Emil Artin in 1929 using his general reciprocity law.

Furtwängler’s proof relied on Artin transfers in non-abelian groups of derived length two. Building on this, researchers sought to apply group-theoretic methods to study principalization in intermediate fields between a base field and its Hilbert class field. The first significant contributions were made in 1934 by Arnold Scholz and Olga Taussky, who introduced the synonym capitulation for principalization.

An alternative approach to the principalization problem, based on Galois cohomology of unit groups, also goes back to Hilbert. In his Zahlbericht, he developed this perspective in the context of cyclic extensions of prime degree, culminating in the celebrated Hilbert’s Theorem 94.

== Extension of classes ==
Let $K$ be an algebraic number field, called the base field, and let $L/K$ be a field extension of finite degree. Let $\mathcal{O}_K,\mathcal{I}_K,\mathcal{P}_K$ and $\mathcal{O}_L,\mathcal{I}_L,\mathcal{P}_L$ denote the ring of integers, the group of nonzero fractional ideals and its subgroup of principal fractional ideals of the fields $K,L$ respectively. Then the extension map of fractional ideals

$$\begin{cases}\iota_{L/K}: \mathcal{I}_K\to\mathcal{I}_L\\ \mathfrak{a}\mapsto\mathfrak{a}\mathcal{O}_L \end{cases}$$

is an injective group homomorphism. Since $\iota_{L/K}(\mathcal{P}_K)\subseteq\mathcal{P}_L$, this map induces the extension homomorphism of ideal class groups

$$\begin{cases}j_{L/K}: \mathcal{I}_K/\mathcal{P}_K\to\mathcal{I}_L/\mathcal{P}_L \\ \mathfrak{a}\mathcal{P}_K \mapsto (\mathfrak{a}\mathcal{O}_L) \mathcal{P}_L \end{cases}$$

If there exists a non-principal ideal $\mathfrak{a}\in\mathcal{I}_K$ (i.e. $\mathfrak{a} \mathcal{P}_K \ne \mathcal{P}_K$) whose extension ideal in $L$ is principal (i.e. $\mathfrak{a} \mathcal{O}_L =A\mathcal{O}_L$ for some $A\in\mathcal{O}_L$ and $(\mathfrak{a}\mathcal{O}_L)\mathcal{P}_L=(A\mathcal{O}_L)\mathcal{P}_L=\mathcal{P}_L$), then we speak about principalization or capitulation in $L/K$. In this case, the ideal $\mathfrak{a}$ and its class $\mathfrak{a}\mathcal{P}_K$ are said to principalize or capitulate in $L$. This phenomenon is described most conveniently by the principalization kernel or capitulation kernel, that is the kernel $\ker(j_{L/K})$ of the class extension homomorphism.

More generally, let $\mathfrak{m}=\mathfrak{m}_0\mathfrak{m}_\infty$ be a modulus in $K$, where $\mathfrak{m}_0$ is a nonzero ideal in $\mathcal{O}_K$ and $\mathfrak{m}_\infty$ is a formal product of pair-wise different real infinite primes of $K$. Then

$$\mathcal{S}_{K,\mathfrak{m}} =\langle\alpha\mathcal{O}_K | \alpha\equiv 1 \bmod{\mathfrak{m}} \rangle \le \mathcal{I}_K (\mathfrak{m}),$$

is the ray modulo $\mathfrak{m}$, where $\mathcal{I}_K (\mathfrak{m}) =\mathcal{I}_K(\mathfrak{m}_0)$ is the group of nonzero fractional ideals in $K$ relatively prime to $\mathfrak{m}_0$ and the condition $\alpha \equiv 1 \bmod{\mathfrak{m}}$ means $\alpha \equiv 1 \bmod{\mathfrak{m}_0}$ and $v(\alpha)>0$ for every real infinite prime $v$ dividing $\mathfrak{m}_\infty.$ Let $\mathcal{S}_{K,\mathfrak{m}} \le \mathcal{H} \le \mathcal{I}_K(\mathfrak{m}),$ then the group $\mathcal{I}_K(\mathfrak{m})/\mathcal{H}$ is called a generalized ideal class group for $\mathfrak{m}.$ If $\mathcal{I}_K(\mathfrak{m}_K)/\mathcal{H}_K$ and $\mathcal{I}_L(\mathfrak{m}_L) /\mathcal{H}_L$ are generalized ideal class groups such that $\mathfrak{a} \mathcal{O}_L \in\mathcal{I}_L(\mathfrak{m}_L)$ for every $\mathfrak{a} \in \mathcal{I}_K(\mathfrak{m}_K)$ and $\mathfrak{a} \mathcal{O}_L \in\mathcal{H}_L$ for every $\mathfrak{a}\in\mathcal{H}_K$, then $\iota_{L/K}$ induces the extension homomorphism of generalized ideal class groups:

$$\begin{cases} j_{L/K}: \mathcal{I}_K(\mathfrak{m}_K)/\mathcal{H}_K\to\mathcal{I}_L(\mathfrak{m}_L)/\mathcal{H}_L \\ \mathfrak{a}\mathcal{H}_K\mapsto(\mathfrak{a}\mathcal{O}_L)\mathcal{H}_L \end{cases}$$

== Galois extensions of number fields ==
Let $F/K$ be a Galois extension of algebraic number fields with Galois group $G=\mathrm{Gal}(F/K)$ and let $\mathbb{P}_K, \mathbb{P}_F$ denote the set of prime ideals of the fields $K,F$ respectively. Suppose that $\mathfrak{p} \in\mathbb{P}_K$ is a prime ideal of $K$ which does not divide the relative discriminant $\mathfrak{d}=\mathfrak{d}(F/K)$, and is therefore unramified in $F$, and let $\mathfrak{P} \in \mathbb{P}_F$ be a prime ideal of $F$ lying over $\mathfrak{p}$.

=== Frobenius automorphism ===
There exists a unique automorphism $\sigma\in G$ such that $A^{\mathrm{N}(\mathfrak{p})} \equiv\sigma(A) \bmod{\mathfrak{P}}$ for all algebraic integers $A\in\mathcal{O}_F$, where $\mathrm{N}(\mathfrak{p})$ is the norm of $\mathfrak{p}$. The map $\left[\frac{F/K}{\mathfrak{P}} \right] :=\sigma$ is called the Frobenius automorphism of $\mathfrak{P}$. It generates the decomposition group $D_{\mathfrak{P}}=\{\sigma\in G|\sigma(\mathfrak{P})=\mathfrak{P}\}$ of $\mathfrak{P}$ and its order is equal to the inertia degree $f:=f(\mathfrak{P}|\mathfrak{p})=[\mathcal{O}_F/ \mathfrak{P}: \mathcal{O}_K/\mathfrak{p}]$ of $\mathfrak{P}$ over $\mathfrak{p}$. (If $\mathfrak{p}$ is ramified then $\left[\frac{F/K}{\mathfrak{P}}\right]$ is only defined and generates $D_{\mathfrak{P}}$ modulo the inertia subgroup

$$I_{\mathfrak{P}}=\{\sigma\in G|\sigma(A)\equiv A\bmod{\mathfrak{P}}\text{ for all } A\in \mathcal{O}_F\} =\ker(D_{\mathfrak{P}} \to\mathrm{Gal}(\mathcal{O}_F/\mathfrak{P}|\mathcal{O}_K/\mathfrak{p}))$$

whose order is the ramification index $e(\mathfrak{P}|\mathfrak{p})$ of $\mathfrak{P}$ over $\mathfrak{p}$). Any other prime ideal of $F$ dividing $\mathfrak{p}$ is of the form $\tau(\mathfrak{P})$ with some $\tau\in G$. Its Frobenius automorphism is given by

$$\left[\frac{F/K}{\tau(\mathfrak{P})}\right]=\tau\left[\frac{F/K}{\mathfrak{P}}\right]\tau^{-1},$$

since

$$\tau(A)^{\mathrm{N}(\mathfrak{p})}\equiv(\tau\sigma\tau^{-1})(\tau(A))\bmod{\tau(\mathfrak{P})}$$

for all $A\in\mathcal{O}_F$, and thus its decomposition group $D_{\tau(\mathfrak{P})}=\tau D_{\mathfrak{P}}\tau^{-1}$ is conjugate to $D_{\mathfrak{P}}$. In this general situation, the Artin symbol is a mapping

$$\mathfrak{p}\mapsto\left(\frac{F/K}{\mathfrak{p}}\right):=\left. \left\{\tau\left[\frac{F/K}{\mathfrak{P}}\right]\tau^{-1} \right | \tau\in G\right\}$$

which associates an entire conjugacy class of automorphisms to any unramified prime ideal $\mathfrak{p}\nmid\mathfrak{d}$, and we have $\left(\frac{F/K}{\mathfrak{p}}\right)=1$ if and only if $\mathfrak{p}$ splits completely in $F$.

=== Factorization of prime ideals ===
When $K\subseteq L\subseteq F$ is an intermediate field with relative Galois group $H=\mathrm{Gal}(F/L)\le G$, more precise statements about the homomorphisms $\iota_{L/K}$ and $j_{L/K}$ are possible because we can construct the factorization of $\mathfrak{p}$ (where $\mathfrak{p}$ is unramified in $F$ as above) in $\mathcal{O}_L$ from its factorization in $\mathcal{O}_F$ as follows. Prime ideals in $\mathcal{O}_F$ lying over $\mathfrak{p}$ are in $G$-equivariant bijection with the $G$-set of left cosets $G/D_{\mathfrak{P}}$, where $\tau(\mathfrak{P})$ corresponds to the coset $\tau D_{\mathfrak{P}}$. For every prime ideal $\mathfrak{q}$ in $\mathcal{O}_L$ lying over $\mathfrak{p}$ the Galois group $H$ acts transitively on the set of prime ideals in $\mathcal{O}_F$ lying over $\mathfrak{q}$, thus such ideals $\mathfrak{q}$ are in bijection with the orbits of the action of $H$ on $G/D_{\mathfrak{P}}$ by left multiplication. Such orbits are in turn in bijection with the double cosets $H\backslash G/D_{\mathfrak{P}}$. Let $(\tau_1,\ldots,\tau_g)$ be a complete system of representatives of these double cosets, thus $G=\dot{\cup}_{i=1}^g\,H\tau_iD_{\mathfrak{P}}$. Furthermore, let $H\cdot\tau_i D_{\mathfrak{P}}$ denote the orbit of the coset $\tau_i D_{\mathfrak{P}}$ in the action of $H$ on the set of left cosets $G/D_{\mathfrak{P}}$ by left multiplication and let $H\tau_i\cdot D_{\mathfrak{P}}$ denote the orbit of the coset $H\tau_i$ in the action of $D_{\mathfrak{P}}$ on the set of right cosets $H\backslash G$ by right multiplication. Then $\mathfrak{p}$ factorizes in $\mathcal{O}_L$ as $\mathfrak{p}\mathcal{O}_L=\prod_{i=1}^g\mathfrak{q}_i$, where $\mathfrak{q}_i\in\mathbb{P}_L$ for $1\le i\le g$ are the prime ideals lying over $\mathfrak{p}$ in $L$ satisfying $\mathfrak{q}_i\mathcal{O}_F=\prod_{\varrho}\varrho(\mathfrak{P})$ with the product running over any system of representatives of $H\cdot\tau_i D_{\mathfrak{P}}$.

We have

$$\#(H\cdot\tau_i D_{\mathfrak{P}})\cdot\#D_{\mathfrak{P}}=\#H\tau_iD_{\mathfrak{P}}=\#(H\tau_i\cdot D_{\mathfrak{P}})\cdot\#H.$$

Let $D_i$ be the decomposition group of $\tau_i(\mathfrak{P})$ over $L$. Then $D_i=H\cap D_{\tau_i(\mathfrak{P})}$ is the stabilizer of $\tau_i D_{\mathfrak{P}}$ in the action of $H$ on $G/D_{\mathfrak{P}}$, so by the orbit-stabilizer theorem we have $\#D_i=\#H/\#(H\cdot\tau_i D_{\mathfrak{P}})$. On the other hand, it's $\#D_i=f(\tau_i(\mathfrak{P})|\mathfrak{q}_i)$, which together gives

$$f(\mathfrak{q}_i|\mathfrak{p}) = \frac{f(\tau_i(\mathfrak{P})|\mathfrak{p})}{f(\tau_i(\mathfrak{P})|\mathfrak{q}_i)}=
\frac{f(\mathfrak{P}|\mathfrak{p})}{\#D_i}=
\frac{\#D_{\mathfrak{P}}}{\#H/\#(H\cdot\tau_i D_{\mathfrak{P}})}=
\frac{\#(H\cdot\tau_i D_{\mathfrak{P}})\cdot\#D_{\mathfrak{P}}}{\#H}=
\frac{\#H\tau_iD_{\mathfrak{P}}}{\#H}=
\#(H\tau_i\cdot D_{\mathfrak{P}}).$$

In other words, the inertia degree $f_i:=f(\mathfrak{q}_i|\mathfrak{p})$ is equal to the size of the orbit of the coset $H\tau_i$ in the action of $\left[\frac{F/K}{\mathfrak{P}}\right]$ on the set of right cosets $H\backslash G$ by right multiplication. By taking inverses, this is equal to the size of the orbit $D_{\mathfrak{P}}\cdot\tau_i^{-1}H$ of the coset $\tau_i^{-1}H$ in the action of $\left[\frac{F/K}{\mathfrak{P}}\right]$ on the set of left cosets $G/H$ by left multiplication. Also the prime ideals in $\mathcal{O}_L$ lying over $\mathfrak{p}$ correspond to the orbits of this action.

Consequently, the ideal embedding is given by $\iota_{L/K}(\mathfrak{p})=\mathfrak{p}\mathcal{O}_L =\prod_{i=1}^g\mathfrak{q}_i$, and the class extension by

$$j_{L/K}(\mathfrak{p}\mathcal{H}_K)=(\mathfrak{p}\mathcal{O}_L)\mathcal{H}_L=\prod_{i=1}^g \mathfrak{q}_i\mathcal{H}_L.$$

=== Artin's reciprocity law ===
Now further assume $F/K$ is an abelian extension, that is, $G$ is an abelian group. Then, all conjugate decomposition groups of prime ideals of $F$ lying over $\mathfrak{p}$ coincide, thus $D_{\mathfrak{p}}:=D_{\tau(\mathfrak{P})}$ for every $\tau\in G$, and the Artin symbol $\left(\frac{F/K}{\mathfrak{p}}\right)=\left[\frac{F/K}{\mathfrak{P}}\right]$ becomes equal to the Frobenius automorphism of any $\mathfrak{P}\mid\mathfrak{p}$ and $A^{\mathrm{N}(\mathfrak{p})}\equiv\left(\frac{F/K}{\mathfrak{p}}\right)(A)\bmod{\mathfrak{P}}$ for all $A\in\mathcal{O}_F$ and every $\mathfrak{P}\mid\mathfrak{p}$.

By class field theory, the abelian extension $F/K$ uniquely corresponds to an intermediate group $\mathcal{S}_{K,\mathfrak{f}} \le\mathcal{H} \le \mathcal{I}_K(\mathfrak{f})$ between the ray modulo $\mathfrak{f}$ of $K$ and $\mathcal{I}_K(\mathfrak{f})$, where $\mathfrak{f}=\mathfrak{f}_0\mathfrak{f}_\infty=\mathfrak{f}(F/K)$ denotes the relative conductor ($\mathfrak{f}_0$ is divisible by the same prime ideals as $\mathfrak{d}$). The Artin symbol

$$\begin{cases} \mathbb{P}_K(\mathfrak{f})\to G\\ \mathfrak{p}\mapsto\left(\frac{F/K}{\mathfrak{p}}\right)\end{cases}$$

which associates the Frobenius automorphism of $\mathfrak{p}$ to each prime ideal $\mathfrak{p}$ of $K$ which is unramified in $F$, can be extended by multiplicativity to a surjective homomorphism

$$\begin{cases} \mathcal{I}_K(\mathfrak{f})\to G\\ \mathfrak{a}=\prod \mathfrak{p}^{v_{\mathfrak{p}}(\mathfrak{a})}\mapsto\left(\frac{F/K}{\mathfrak{a}}\right):=\prod \left(\frac{F/K}{\mathfrak{p}}\right)^{v_{\mathfrak{p}}(\mathfrak{a})}\end{cases}$$

with kernel $\mathcal{H}=\mathcal{S}_{K,\mathfrak{f}}\cdot\mathrm{N}_{F/K}(\mathcal{I}_F(\mathfrak{f}))$ (where $\mathcal{I}_F(\mathfrak{f})$ means $\mathcal{I}_F(\mathfrak{f}_0\mathcal{O}_F)$), called Artin map, which induces isomorphism

$$\begin{cases}\mathcal{I}_K(\mathfrak{f})/\mathcal{H}\to G=\mathrm{Gal}(F/K)\\ \mathfrak{a}\mathcal{H}\mapsto\left(\frac{F/K}{\mathfrak{a}} \right) \end{cases}$$

of the generalized ideal class group $\mathcal{I}_K(\mathfrak{f})/\mathcal{H}$ to the Galois group $G$. This explicit isomorphism is called the Artin reciprocity law or general reciprocity law.

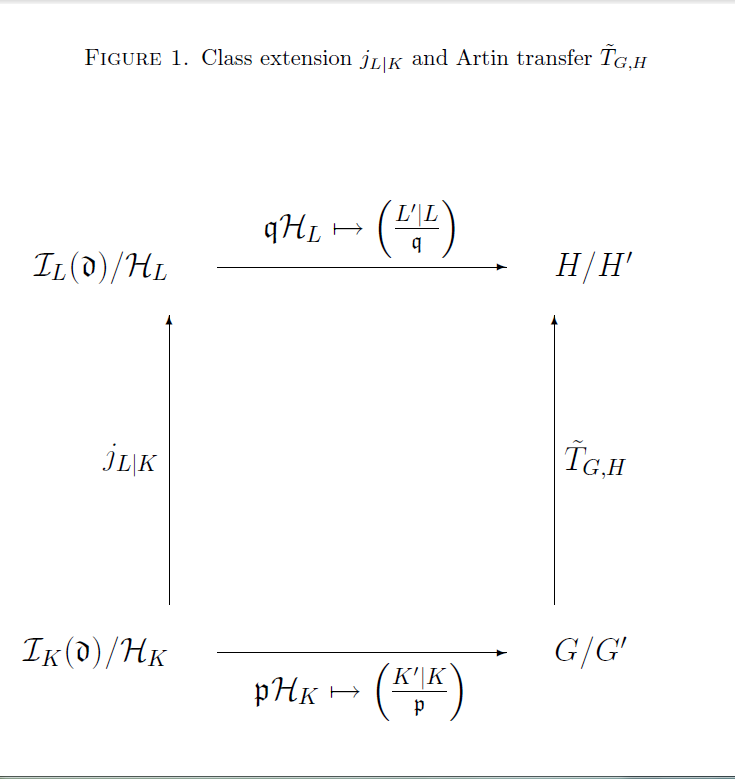
Figure 1: Commutative diagram connecting the class extension with the Artin transfer.

== Group-theoretic formulation of the problem ==
This reciprocity law allowed Artin to translate the general principalization problem for number fields $K\subseteq L\subseteq F$ based on the following scenario from number theory to group theory. Let $F/K$ be a Galois extension of algebraic number fields with automorphism group $G=\mathrm{Gal}(F/K)$. Assume that $K\subseteq L\subseteq F$ is an intermediate field with relative group $H= \mathrm{Gal}(F/L)\le G$ and let $K'/K, L'/L$ be the maximal abelian subextension of $K, L$ respectively within $F$. Then the corresponding relative groups are the commutator subgroups $G'=\mathrm{Gal}(F/K')\le G$, resp. $H'=\mathrm{Gal}(F/L')\le H$. By class field theory, there exist intermediate groups $\mathcal{S}_{K,\mathfrak{m}_K} \le\mathcal{H}_K\le \mathcal{I}_K(\mathfrak{d})$ and $\mathcal{S}_{L,\mathfrak{m}_L}\le\mathcal{H}_L\le\mathcal{I}_L(\mathfrak{d})$ such that the Artin maps establish isomorphisms

$$\begin{align}
&\left(\frac{K'/K}{\cdot}\right):\mathcal{I}_K(\mathfrak{d})/\mathcal{H}_K\to\mathrm{Gal}(K'/K)\simeq G/G' \\
&\left(\frac{L'/L}{\cdot}\right):\mathcal{I}_L(\mathfrak{d})/\mathcal{H}_L\to\mathrm{Gal}(L'/L)\simeq H/H'
\end{align}$$

Here $\mathfrak{d}=\mathfrak{d}(F/K), \mathcal{I}_L(\mathfrak{d})$ means $\mathcal{I}_L(\mathfrak{d}\mathcal{O}_L)$ and $\mathfrak{m}_K,\mathfrak{m}_L$ are some moduli divisible by $\mathfrak{f}(K'/K),\mathfrak{f}(L'/L)$ respectively and by all primes dividing $\mathfrak{d},\mathfrak{d}\mathcal{O}_L$ respectively.

The ideal extension homomorphism $\iota_{L/K}:\,\mathcal{I}_K(\mathfrak{d})\to\mathcal{I}_L(\mathfrak{d})$, the induced Artin transfer $\tilde{T}_{G,H}$ and these Artin maps are connected by the formula

$$\tilde{T}_{G,H}\circ\left(\frac{K'/K}{\cdot}\right)=\left(\frac{L'/L}{\cdot}\right)\circ \iota_{L/K}.$$

Since $\mathcal{I}_K(\mathfrak{d})$ is generated by the prime ideals of $K$ which does not divide $\mathfrak{d}$, it's enough to verify this equality on these generators. Hence suppose that $\mathfrak{p}\in\mathbb{P}_K$ is a prime ideal of $K$ which does not divide $\mathfrak{d}$ and let $\mathfrak{P}\in\mathbb{P}_F$ be a prime ideal of $F$ lying over $\mathfrak{p}$. On the one hand, the ideal extension homomorphism $\iota_{L/K}$ maps the ideal $\mathfrak{p}$ of the base field $K$ to the extension ideal $\iota_{L/K}(\mathfrak{p})=\mathfrak{p}\mathcal{O}_L=\prod_{i=1}^g \mathfrak{q}_i$ in the field $L$, and the Artin map $\left(\frac{L'/L}{\cdot}\right)$ of the field $L$ maps this product of prime ideals to the product of conjugates of Frobenius automorphisms

$$\prod_{i=1}^g\left(\frac{L'/L}{\mathfrak{q}_i}\right)= \prod_{i=1}^g \left[\frac{F/L}{\tau_i(\mathfrak{P})}\right]\cdot H'=
\prod_{i=1}^g \tau_i\left[\frac{F/L}{\mathfrak{P}}\right]\tau_i^{-1}\cdot H'= \prod_{i=1}^g \tau_i\left[\frac{F/K}{\mathfrak{P}} \right]^{f_i} \tau_i^{-1}\cdot H',$$

where the double coset decomposition and its representatives used here is the same as in the last but one section. On the other hand, the Artin map $\left(\frac{K'/K}{\cdot}\right)$ of the base field $K$ maps the ideal $\mathfrak{p}$ to the Frobenius automorphism $\left(\frac{K'/K}{\mathfrak{p}}\right)=\left[\frac{F/K}{\mathfrak{P}}\right]\cdot G'$. The $g$-tuple $(\tau_1^{-1},\ldots,\tau_g^{-1})$ is a system of representatives of double cosets $D_{\mathfrak{P}}\backslash G/H$, which correspond to the orbits of the action of $\left[\frac{F/K}{\mathfrak{P}}\right]$ on the set of left cosets $G/H$ by left multiplication, and $f_i=\#(H\tau_i\cdot D_{\mathfrak{P}})=\#(D_{\mathfrak{P}}\cdot\tau_i^{-1}H)$ is equal to the size of the orbit of coset $\tau_i^{-1}H$ in this action. Hence the induced Artin transfer maps $\left[\frac{F/K}{\mathfrak{P}}\right]\cdot G'$ to the product

$$\tilde{T}_{G,H}\left(\left[\frac{F/K}{\mathfrak{P}}\right]\cdot G'\right)= T_{G,H}\left(\left[\frac{F/K}{\mathfrak{P}} \right] \right)= \prod_{i=1}^g (\tau_i^{-1})^{-1}\left[\frac{F/K}{\mathfrak{P}}\right]^{f_i}\tau_i^{-1}\cdot H'= \prod_{i=1}^g \tau_i \left[ \frac{F/K}{\mathfrak{P}}\right]^{f_i}\tau_i^{-1}\cdot H'.$$

This product expression was the original form of the Artin transfer homomorphism, corresponding to a decomposition of the permutation representation into disjoint cycles.

Since the kernels of the Artin maps $\left(\tfrac{K'/K}{\cdot}\right)$ and $\left(\tfrac{L'/L}{\cdot}\right)$ are $\mathcal{H}_K$ and $\mathcal{H}_L$ respectively, the previous formula implies that $\iota_{L/K}(\mathcal{H}_K)\subseteq\mathcal{H}_L$. It follows that there is the class extension homomorphism $j_{L/K}: \mathcal{I}_K(\mathfrak{d})/\mathcal{H}_K\to\mathcal{I}_L(\mathfrak{d})/\mathcal{H}_L$ and that $j_{L/K}$ and the induced Artin transfer $\tilde{T}_{G,H}$ are connected by the commutative diagram in Figure 1 via the isomorphisms induced by the Artin maps, that is, we have equality of two composita $\tilde{T}_{G,H}\circ\left(\tfrac{K'/K}{\cdot}\right) =\left( \tfrac{L'/L}{\cdot} \right)\circ j_{L/K}$.

== Class field tower ==
The commutative diagram in the previous section, which connects the number theoretic class extension homomorphism $j_{L/K}$ with the group theoretic Artin transfer $T_{G,H}$, enabled Furtwängler to prove the principal ideal theorem by specializing to the situation that $L=F^1(K)$ is the (first) Hilbert class field of $K$, that is the maximal abelian unramified extension of $K$, and $F=F^2(K)$ is the second Hilbert class field of $K$, that is the maximal metabelian unramified extension of $K$ (and maximal abelian unramified extension of $F^1(K)$). Then $K'=L, L'=F, \mathfrak{d}=\mathcal{O}_K, \mathcal{H}_K=\mathcal{P}_K, \mathcal{H}_L =\mathcal{P}_L$ and $H=G'$ is the commutator subgroup of $G$. More precisely, Furtwängler showed that generally the Artin transfer $T_{G,G'}$ from a finite metabelian group $G$ to its derived subgroup $G'$ is a trivial homomorphism. In fact this is true even if $G$ isn't metabelian because we can reduce to the metabelian case by replacing $G$ with $G/G''$. It also holds for infinite groups provided $G$ is finitely generated and $[G:G']<\infty$. It follows that every ideal of $K$ extends to a principal ideal of $F^1(K)$.

However, the commutative diagram comprises the potential for a lot of more sophisticated applications. In the situation that $p$ is a prime number, $F=F^2_p(K)$ is the second Hilbert p-class field of $K$, that is the maximal metabelian unramified extension of $K$ of degree a power of $p, L$ varies over the intermediate field between $K$ and its first Hilbert p-class field $F^1_p(K)$, and $H=\mathrm{Gal}(F^2_p(K)/L)\le G=\mathrm{Gal}(F^2_p(K)/K)$ correspondingly varies over the intermediate groups between $G$ and $G'$, computation of all principalization kernels $\ker(j_{L/K})$ and all p-class groups $\mathrm{Cl}_p(L)$ translates to information on the kernels $\ker(T_{G,H})$ and targets $H/H'$ of the Artin transfers $T_{G,H}$ and permits the exact specification of the second p-class group $G=\mathrm{Gal}(F^2_p(K)/K)$ of $K$ via pattern recognition, and frequently even allows to draw conclusions about the entire p-class field tower of $K$, that is the Galois group $\mathrm{Gal}(F^{\infty}_p(K)/K)$ of the maximal unramified pro-p extension $F^{\infty}_p(K)$ of $K$.

These ideas are explicit in the paper of 1934 by A. Scholz and O. Taussky already. At these early stages, pattern recognition consisted of specifying the annihilator ideals, or symbolic orders, and the Schreier relations of metabelian p-groups and subsequently using a uniqueness theorem on group extensions by O. Schreier. Nowadays, we use the p-group generation algorithm of M. F. Newman and E. A. O'Brien for constructing descendant trees of p-groups and searching patterns, defined by kernels and targets of Artin transfers, among the vertices of these trees.

== Galois cohomology ==
In the chapter on cyclic extensions of number fields of prime degree of his number report from 1897, D. Hilbert proves a series of crucial theorems which culminate in Theorem 94, the original germ of class field theory. Today, these theorems can be viewed as the beginning of what is now called Galois cohomology. Hilbert considers a finite relative extension $L/K$ of algebraic number fields with cyclic Galois group $G=\mathrm{Gal}(L/K)=\langle\sigma\rangle$ generated by an automorphism $\sigma$ such that $\sigma^\ell=1$ for the relative degree $\ell=[ L:K]$, which is assumed to be an odd prime.

He investigates two endomorphism of the unit group $U=U_L$ of the extension field, viewed as a Galois module with respect to the group $G$, briefly a $G$-module. The first endomorphism

$$\begin{cases} \Delta: U\to U \\ E\mapsto E^{\sigma-1}:=\sigma(E)/E \end{cases}$$

is the symbolic exponentiation with the difference $\sigma-1\in\Z[ G]$, and the second endomorphism

$$\begin{cases} N: U\to U \\ E\mapsto E^{T_G}:=\prod_{i=0}^{\ell-1}\sigma^i(E) \end{cases}$$

is the algebraic norm mapping, that is the symbolic exponentiation with the trace

$$T_G=\sum_{i=0}^{\ell-1}\sigma^i\in\Z[G].$$

In fact, the image of the algebraic norm map is contained in the unit group $U_K$ of the base field and $N(E)= \mathrm{N}_{L/K}(E)$ coincides with the usual arithmetic (field) norm as the product of all conjugates. The composita of the endomorphisms satisfy the relations $\Delta\circ N=1$ and $N\circ\Delta=1$.

Two important cohomology groups can be defined by means of the kernels and images of these endomorphisms. The zeroth Tate cohomology group of $G$ in $U_L$ is given by the quotient $H^0(G,U_L):=\ker(\Delta)/\mathrm{im}(N)= U_K/\mathrm{N}_{L/K}(U_L)$ consisting of the norm residues of $U_K$, and the minus first Tate cohomology group of $G$ in $U_L$ is given by the quotient $H^{-1}(G,U_L):=\ker(N)/\mathrm{im}(\Delta)=E_{L/K}/U_L^{\sigma-1}$ of the group $E_{L/K}=\{ E\in U_L| N(E)=1\}$ of relative units of $L/K$ modulo the subgroup of symbolic powers of units with formal exponent $\sigma-1$.

In his Theorem 92 Hilbert proves the existence of a relative unit $H\in E_{L/K}$ which cannot be expressed as $H=\sigma(E)/E$, for any unit $E\in U_L$, which means that the minus first cohomology group $H^{-1}(G,U_L)=E_{L/K}/U_L^{\sigma-1}$ is non-trivial of order divisible by $\ell$. However, with the aid of a completely similar construction, the minus first cohomology group $H^{-1}(G,L^{\times})=\{ A\in L^{\times}| N(A)=1\}/ (L^{\times})^{\sigma-1}$ of the $G$-module $L^{\times}=L\setminus\{ 0\}$, the multiplicative group of the superfield $L$, can be defined, and Hilbert shows its triviality $H^{-1}(G,L^{\times})=1$ in his famous Theorem 90.

Eventually, Hilbert is in the position to state his celebrated Theorem 94: If $L/K$ is a cyclic extension of number fields of odd prime degree $\ell$ with trivial relative discriminant $\mathfrak{d}_{L/K}=\mathcal{O}_K$, which means it's unramified at finite primes, then there exists a non-principal ideal $\mathfrak{j}\in\mathcal{I}_K\setminus\mathcal{P}_K$ of the base field $K$ which becomes principal in the extension field $L$, that is $\mathfrak{j}\mathcal{O}_L=A\mathcal{O}_L\in\mathcal{P}_L$ for some $A\in\mathcal{O}_L$. Furthermore, the $\ell$th power of this non-principal ideal is principal in the base field $K$, in particular $\mathfrak{j}^{\ell}=\mathrm{N}_{L/K}(A)\mathcal{O}_K\in\mathcal{P}_K$, hence the class number of the base field must be divisible by $\ell$ and the extension field $L$ can be called a class field of $K$. The proof goes as follows: Theorem 92 says there exists unit $H\in E_{L/K}\setminus U_L^{\sigma-1}$, then Theorem 90 ensures the existence of a (necessarily non-unit) $A\in L^{\times}$ such that $H=A^{\sigma-1}$, i. e., $A^{\sigma}=A\cdot H$. By multiplying $A$ by proper integer if necessary we may assume that $A$ is an algebraic integer. The non-unit $A$ is generator of an ambiguous principal ideal of $L/K$, since $(A\mathcal{O}_L)^{\sigma}=A^{\sigma}\mathcal{O}_L=A\cdot H\mathcal{O}_L=A\mathcal{O}_L$. However, the underlying ideal $\mathfrak{j}:=(A\mathcal{O}_L)\cap\mathcal{O}_K$ of the subfield $K$ cannot be principal. Assume to the contrary that $\mathfrak{j}=\beta\mathcal{O}_K$ for some $\beta\in\mathcal{O}_K$. Since $L/K$ is unramified, every ambiguous ideal $\mathfrak{a}$ of $\mathcal{O}_L$ is a lift of some ideal in $\mathcal{O}_K$, in particular $\mathfrak{a}=(\mathfrak{a}\cap\mathcal{O}_K)\mathcal{O}_L$. Hence $\beta\mathcal{O}_L=\mathfrak{j}\mathcal{O}_L=A\mathcal{O}_L$ and thus $A=\beta E$ for some unit $E\in U_L$. This would imply the contradiction $H=A^{\sigma-1}=(\beta E)^{\sigma-1}=E^{\sigma-1}$ because $\beta^{\sigma-1}=1$. On the other hand,

$$\mathfrak{j}^{\ell}\mathcal{O}_L= (\mathfrak{j}\mathcal{O}_L)^{\ell} =\mathrm{N}_{L/K} (\mathfrak{j}\mathcal{O}_L) \mathcal{O}_L= \mathrm{N}_{L/K}(A\mathcal{O}_L)\mathcal{O}_L=\mathrm{N}_{L/K}(A)\mathcal{O}_L,$$

thus $\mathfrak{j}^{\ell}=\mathrm{N}_{L/K}(A)\mathcal{O}_K$ is principal in the base field $K$ already.

Theorems 92 and 94 don't hold as stated for $\ell=2$, with the fields $K=\Q(\sqrt{3})$ and $L=K(i)$ being a counterexample (in this particular case $L$ is the narrow Hilbert class field of $K$). The reason is Hilbert only considers ramification at finite primes but not at infinite primes (we say that a real infinite prime of $K$ ramifies in $L$ if there exists non-real extension of this prime to $L$). This doesn't make a difference when $[L:K]$ is odd since the extension is then unramified at infinite primes. However he notes that Theorems 92 and 94 hold for $\ell=2$ provided we further assume that number of fields conjugate to $L$ that are real is twice the number of real fields conjugate to $K$. This condition is equivalent to $L/K$ being unramified at infinite primes, so Theorem 94 holds for all primes $\ell$ if we assume that $L/K$ is unramified everywhere.

Theorem 94 implies the simple inequality $\#\ker(j_{L/K})\ge\ell=[L:K]$ for the order of the principalization kernel of the extension $L/K$. However an exact formula for the order of this kernel can be derived for cyclic unramified (including infinite primes) extension (not necessarily of prime degree) by means of the Herbrand quotient $h(G,U_L)$ of the $G$-module $U_L$, which is given by

$$h(G,U_L):=\#H^{-1}(G,U_L)/\#H^0(G,U_L)=(\ker(N):\mathrm{im}(\Delta))/(\ker(\Delta):\mathrm{im}(N))=(E_{L/K}:U_L^{\sigma-1})/(U_K:\mathrm{N}_{L/K}(U_L)).$$

It can be shown that $h(G,U_L)=[ L:K]$ (without calculating the order of either of the cohomology groups). Since the extension $L/K$ is unramified, it's $\mathcal{I}^G_L=\mathcal{I}_K\mathcal{O}_L$ so $\mathcal{P}^G_L =\mathcal{P}_L \cap\mathcal{I}_K\mathcal{O}_L$ . With the aid of K. Iwasawa's isomorphism $H^1(G,U_L)\cong\mathcal{P}^G_L/\mathcal{P}_K\mathcal{O}_L$, specialized to a cyclic extension with periodic cohomology of length $2$, we obtain

$$\begin{align}
\#\ker(j_{L/K})&=\#(\mathcal{P}_L\cap\mathcal{I}_K\mathcal{O}_L/\mathcal{P}_K\mathcal{O}_L)= \#(\mathcal{P}^G_L /\mathcal{P}_K \mathcal{O}_L) =\#H^1(G,U_L)=\#H^{-1}(G,U_L) \\
&=h(G,U_L)\cdot\#H^0(G,U_L)=[ L:K]\cdot\#H^0(G,U_L)= [L:K]\cdot (U_K:\mathrm{N}_{L/K}(U_L))
\end{align}$$

This relation increases the lower bound by the factor $(U_K:\mathrm{N}_{L/K}(U_L))$, the so-called unit norm index.

== History ==
As mentioned in the lead section, several investigators tried to generalize the Hilbert-Artin-Furtwängler principal ideal theorem of 1930 to questions concerning the principalization in intermediate extensions between the base field and its Hilbert class field. On the one hand, they established general theorems on the principalization over arbitrary number fields, such as Ph. Furtwängler 1932, O. Taussky 1932, O. Taussky 1970, and H. Kisilevsky 1970. On the other hand, they searched for concrete numerical examples of principalization in unramified cyclic extensions of particular kinds of base fields.

=== Quadratic fields ===
The principalization of $3$-classes of imaginary quadratic fields $K=\Q(\sqrt{d})$ with $3$-class rank two in unramified cyclic cubic extensions was calculated manually for three discriminants $d\in\{ -3299,-4027,-9748\}$ by A. Scholz and O. Taussky in 1934. Since these calculations require composition of binary quadratic forms and explicit knowledge of fundamental systems of units in cubic number fields, which was a very difficult task in 1934, the investigations stayed at rest for half a century until F.-P. Heider and B. Schmithals employed the CDC Cyber 76 computer at the University of Cologne to extend the information concerning principalization to the range $-2\cdot 10^4 < d < 10^5$ containing $27$ relevant discriminants in 1982, thereby providing the first analysis of five real quadratic fields. Two years later, J. R. Brink computed the principalization types of $66$ complex quadratic fields. Currently, the most extensive computation of principalization data for all $4596$ quadratic fields with discriminants $-10^6 < d < 10^7$ and $3$-class group of type $(3,3)$ is due to D. C. Mayer in 2010, who used his recently discovered connection between transfer kernels and transfer targets for the design of a new principalization algorithm.

The $2$-principalization in unramified quadratic extensions of imaginary quadratic fields with $2$-class group of type $(2,2)$ was studied by H. Kisilevsky in 1976. Similar investigations of real quadratic fields were carried out by E. Benjamin and C. Snyder in 1995.

=== Cubic fields ===
The $2$-principalization in unramified quadratic extensions of cyclic cubic fields with $2$-class group of type $(2,2)$ was investigated by A. Derhem in 1988. Seven years later, M. Ayadi studied the $3$-principalization in unramified cyclic cubic extensions of cyclic cubic fields $K\subset\Q(\zeta_f)$, $\zeta_f^f=1$, with $3$-class group of type $(3,3)$ and conductor $f$ divisible by two or three primes.

=== Sextic fields ===
In 1992, M. C. Ismaili investigated the $3$-principalization in unramified cyclic cubic extensions of the normal closure of pure cubic fields $K=\Q(\sqrt[3]{D})$, in the case that this sextic number field $N=K(\zeta_3)$, $\zeta_3^3=1$, has a $3$-class group of type $(3,3)$.

=== Quartic fields ===
In 1993, A. Azizi studied the $2$-principalization in unramified quadratic extensions of biquadratic fields of Dirichlet type $K=\Q(\sqrt{d},\sqrt{-1})$ with $2$-class group of type $(2,2)$. Most recently, in 2014, A. Zekhnini extended the investigations to Dirichlet fields with $2$-class group of type $(2,2,2)$, thus providing the first examples of $2$-principalization in the two layers of unramified quadratic and biquadratic extensions of quartic fields with class groups of $2$-rank three.

== See also ==
Both, the algebraic, group theoretic access to the principalization problem by Hilbert-Artin-Furtwängler and the arithmetic, cohomological access by Hilbert-Herbrand-Iwasawa are also presented in detail in the two bibles of capitulation by J.-F. Jaulent 1988 and by K. Miyake 1989.

== Secondary sources ==
- Cassels, J.W.S.; Fröhlich, Albrecht, eds. (1967). Algebraic Number Theory. Academic Press. Zbl 0153.07403.
- Iwasawa, Kenkichi (1986). Local class field theory. Oxford Mathematical Monographs. Oxford University Press. ISBN 978-0-19-504030-2. MR 0863740. Zbl 0604.12014.
- Janusz, Gerald J. (1973). Algebraic number fields. Pure and Applied Mathematics. Vol. 55. Academic Press. p. 142. Zbl 0307.12001.
- Neukirch, Jürgen (1999). Algebraic Number Theory. Grundlehren der Mathematischen Wissenschaften. Vol. 322. Springer-Verlag. ISBN 978-3-540-65399-8. MR 1697859. Zbl 0956.11021.
- Neukirch, Jürgen; Schmidt, Alexander; Wingberg, Kay (2008). Cohomology of Number Fields. Grundlehren der Mathematischen Wissenschaften (in German). Vol. 323 (2nd ed.). Springer-Verlag. ISBN 978-3-540-37888-4. Zbl 1136.11001.
