= List of algebraic number theory topics =

This is a list of algebraic number theory topics.

== Basic topics ==
These topics are basic to the field, either as prototypical examples, or as basic objects of study.

- Algebraic number field
  - Gaussian integer, Gaussian rational
  - Quadratic field
  - Cyclotomic field
  - Cubic field
  - Biquadratic field
- Quadratic reciprocity
- Ideal class group
- Dirichlet's unit theorem
- Discriminant of an algebraic number field
- Ramification (mathematics)
- Root of unity
- Gaussian period

== Important problems ==
- Fermat's Last Theorem
- Class number problem for imaginary quadratic fields
  - Stark–Heegner theorem
    - Heegner number
- Langlands program

== General aspects ==
- Different ideal
- Dedekind domain
- Splitting of prime ideals in Galois extensions
- Decomposition group
- Inertia group
- Frobenius automorphism
- Chebotarev's density theorem
- Totally real field
- Local field
  - p-adic number
  - p-adic analysis
- Adele ring
- Idele group
- Idele class group
- Adelic algebraic group
- Global field
- Hasse principle
  - Hasse–Minkowski theorem
- Galois module
- Galois cohomology
  - Brauer group

== Class field theory ==
- Class field theory
- Abelian extension
- Kronecker–Weber theorem
- Hilbert class field
- Takagi existence theorem
- Hasse norm theorem
- Artin reciprocity
- Local class field theory

== Iwasawa theory ==
- Iwasawa theory
- Herbrand–Ribet theorem
- Vandiver's conjecture
- Stickelberger's theorem
- Euler system
- p-adic L-function

== Arithmetic geometry ==
- Arithmetic geometry
- Complex multiplication
- Abelian variety of CM-type
  - Chowla–Selberg formula
- Hasse–Weil zeta function
