= Bauerian extension =

Field extension of algebraic number field characterized by prime ideals of inertial deg 1

In mathematics, in the field of algebraic number theory, a Bauerian extension is a field extension of an algebraic number field which is characterized by the prime ideals with inertial degree one in the extension.

For a finite degree extension L/K of an algebraic number field K we define P(L/K) to be the set of primes p of K which have a factor P with inertial degree one (that is, the residue field of P has the same order as the residue field of p).

Bauer's theorem states that if M/K is a finite degree Galois extension, then P(M/K) ⊇ P(L/K) if and only if M ⊆ L. In particular, finite degree Galois extensions N of K are characterised by set of prime ideals which split completely in N.

An extension F/K is Bauerian if it obeys Bauer's theorem: that is, for every finite extension L of K, we have P(F/K) ⊇ P(L/K) if and only if L contains a subfield K-isomorphic to F.

All field extensions of degree at most 4 over Q are Bauerian. An example of a non-Bauerian extension is the Galois extension of Q by the roots of 2x^{5} − 32x + 1, which has Galois group S_{5}.

== See also ==
- Splitting of prime ideals in Galois extensions
