= Ring class field =

In algebraic number theory, a ring class field is the abelian extension of an algebraic number field $K$ associated by class field theory to the ring class group of some order $\mathcal{O}$ of the ring of integers of $K$.

== Examples ==
- Let $K$ be any number field. The ring class field for the maximal order $\mathcal{O}=\mathcal{O}_K$ is the Hilbert class field $H$.
- Let $K=\Q(\sqrt{-n})$.
  - The ring class field for the order $\mathcal{O}=\Z[\sqrt{-n}]$ is $L=K(a)$, where $a$ is an algebraic integer with minimal polynomial over $\Q$ of degree $h(-4n)$, the class number of an order with discriminant $-4n$. Moreover, if $p$ is an odd prime not dividing $n$, then $p$ splits completely in $L$ if and only if $p$ splits completely in $K$.
  - If $\mathcal{O}$ is an order and $a$ is a proper fractional O-ideal; i.e.

$$\{x\in K^\times: xa\subset a\}=\mathcal{O}$$,

write $j(a)$ for the j-invariant of the associated elliptic curve. Then $K(j(a))$ is the ring class field of $\mathcal{O}$ and $j(a)$ is an algebraic integer.
