= Capitulation =

Capitulation may have the following special meanings.

- Capitulation (surrender)
- Stock market capitulation
- Capitulation (treaty)
  - Capitulations of the Ottoman Empire
- Capitulation (algebra)
- Conclave capitulation
- Electoral capitulation
