= Hermite–Minkowski theorem =

Theorem in algebraic number theory

In mathematics, especially in algebraic number theory, the Hermite–Minkowski theorem states that for any integer N there are only finitely many number fields, i.e., finite field extensions K of the rational numbers Q, such that the discriminant of K/Q is at most N. The theorem is named after Charles Hermite and Hermann Minkowski.

This theorem is a consequence of the estimate for the discriminant

$$\sqrt{|d_K|} \geq \frac{n^n}{n!}\left(\frac\pi4\right)^{\frac{n}{2}}$$

where n is the degree of the field extension, together with Stirling's formula for n!. This inequality also shows that the discriminant of any number field strictly bigger than Q is not ±1, which in turn implies that Q has no unramified extensions.
