= Minkowski space (number field) =

In mathematics, specifically the field of algebraic number theory, a Minkowski space is a Euclidean space associated with an algebraic number field.

If K is a number field of degree d then there are d distinct embeddings of K into C. We let K_{C} be the image of K in the product C^{d}, considered as equipped with the usual Hermitian inner product. If c denotes complex conjugation, let K_{R} denote the subspace of K_{C} fixed by c, equipped with a scalar product. This is the Minkowski space of K.

== See also ==
- Geometry of numbers
