= P-group generation algorithm =

In mathematics, specifically group theory, finite groups of prime power order $p^n$, for a fixed prime number $p$ and varying integer exponents $n\ge 0$, are briefly called finite p-groups.

The p-group generation algorithm by M. F. Newman and E. A. O'Brien is a recursive process for constructing the descendant tree of an assigned finite p-group which is taken as the root of the tree.

== Lower exponent-p central series ==
For a finite p-group $G$, the lower exponent-p central series (briefly lower p-central series) of $G$ is a descending series $(P_j(G))_{j\ge 0}$ of characteristic subgroups of $G$, defined recursively by

$(1)\qquad P_0(G):=G$ and $P_j(G):=\lbrack P_{j-1}(G),G\rbrack\cdot P_{j-1}(G)^p$, for $j\ge 1$.

Since any non-trivial finite p-group $G>1$ is nilpotent, there exists an integer $c\ge 1$ such that $P_{c-1}(G)>P_c(G)=1$ and $\mathrm{cl}_p(G):=c$ is called the exponent-p class (briefly p-class) of $G$. Only the trivial group $1$ has $\mathrm{cl}_p(1)=0$. Generally, for any finite p-group $G$, its p-class can be defined as $\mathrm{cl}_p(G):=\min\lbrace c\ge 0\mid P_c(G)=1\rbrace$.

The complete lower p-central series of $G$ is therefore given by

$(2)\qquad G=P_0(G)>\Phi(G)=P_1(G)>P_2(G)>\cdots>P_{c-1}(G)>P_c(G)=1$,

since $P_1(G)=\lbrack P_0(G),G\rbrack\cdot P_0(G)^p=\lbrack G,G\rbrack\cdot G^p=\Phi(G)$ is the Frattini subgroup of $G$.

For the convenience of the reader and for pointing out the shifted numeration, we recall that the (usual) lower central series of $G$ is also a descending series $(\gamma_j(G))_{j\ge 1}$ of characteristic subgroups of $G$, defined recursively by

$(3)\qquad \gamma_1(G):=G$ and $\gamma_j(G):=\lbrack\gamma_{j-1}(G),G\rbrack$, for $j\ge 2$.

As above, for any non-trivial finite p-group $G>1$, there exists an integer $c\ge 1$ such that $\gamma_c(G)>\gamma_{c+1}(G)=1$ and $\mathrm{cl}(G):=c$ is called the nilpotency class of $G$, whereas $c+1$ is called the index of nilpotency of $G$. Only the trivial group $1$ has $\mathrm{cl}(1)=0$.

The complete lower central series of $G$ is given by

$(4)\qquad G=\gamma_1(G)>G^{\prime}=\gamma_2(G)>\gamma_3(G)>\cdots>\gamma_c(G)>\gamma_{c+1}(G)=1$,

since $\gamma_2(G)=\lbrack\gamma_1(G),G\rbrack=\lbrack G,G\rbrack=G^{\prime}$ is the commutator subgroup or derived subgroup of $G$.

The following Rules should be remembered for the exponent-p class:

Let $G$ be a finite p-group.

R

1. Rule: $\mathrm{cl}(G)\le\mathrm{cl}_p(G)$, since the $\gamma_j(G)$ descend more quickly than the $P_j(G)$.
2. Rule: If $\vartheta\in\mathrm{Hom}(G,\tilde{G})$, for some group $\tilde{G}$, then $\vartheta(P_j(G))=P_j(\vartheta(G))$, for any $j\ge 0$.
3. Rule: For any $c\ge 0$, the conditions $N\triangleleft G$ and $\mathrm{cl}_p(G/N)=c$ imply $P_c(G)\le N$.
4. Rule: Let $c\ge 0$. If $\mathrm{cl}_p(G)=c$, then $\mathrm{cl}_p(G/P_k(G))=\min(k,c)$, for all $k\ge 0$, in particular, $\mathrm{cl}_p(G/P_k(G))=k$, for all $0\le k\le c$.

== Parents and descendant trees ==
The parent $\pi(G)$ of a finite non-trivial p-group $G>1$ with exponent-p class $\mathrm{cl}_p(G)=c\ge 1$ is defined as the quotient $\pi(G):=G/P_{c-1}(G)$ of $G$ by the last non-trivial term $P_{c-1}(G)>1$ of the lower exponent-p central series of $G$. Conversely, in this case, $G$ is called an immediate descendant of $\pi(G)$. The p-classes of parent and immediate descendant are connected by $\mathrm{cl}_p(G)=\mathrm{cl}_p(\pi(G))+1$.

A descendant tree is a hierarchical structure for visualizing parent-descendant relations between isomorphism classes of finite p-groups. The vertices of a descendant tree are isomorphism classes of finite p-groups. However, a vertex will always be labelled by selecting a representative of the corresponding isomorphism class. Whenever a vertex $\pi(G)$ is the parent of a vertex $G$ a directed edge of the descendant tree is defined by $G\to\pi(G)$ in the direction of the canonical projection $\pi:G\to\pi(G)$ onto the quotient $\pi(G)=G/P_{c-1}(G)$.

In a descendant tree, the concepts of parents and immediate descendants can be generalized. A vertex $R$ is a descendant of a vertex $P$, and $P$ is an ancestor of $R$, if either $R$ is equal to $P$ or there is a path

$(5)\qquad R=Q_0\to Q_1\to\cdots\to Q_{m-1}\to Q_m=P$, where $m\ge 1$,

of directed edges from $R$ to $P$. The vertices forming the path necessarily coincide with the iterated parents $Q_j=\pi^{j}(R)$ of $R$, with $0\le j\le m$:

$(6)\qquad R=\pi^{0}(R)\to\pi^{1}(R)\to\cdots\to\pi^{m-1}(R)\to\pi^{m}(R)=P$, where $m\ge 1$.

They can also be viewed as the successive quotients $Q_j=R/P_{c-j}(R)$ of p-class $c-j$ of $R$ when the p-class of $R$ is given by $\mathrm{cl}_p(R)=c\ge m$:

$(7)\qquad R\simeq R/P_c(R)\to R/P_{c-1}(R)\to\cdots\to R/P_{c+1-m}(R)\to R/P_{c-m}(R)\simeq P$, where $c\ge m\ge 1$.

In particular, every non-trivial finite p-group $G>1$ defines a maximal path (consisting of $c=\mathrm{cl}_p(G)$ edges)

$(8)\qquad G\simeq G/1=G/P_c(G)\to\pi(G)=G/P_{c-1}(G)\to\pi^2(G)=G/P_{c-2}(G)\to\cdots$

$$\cdots\to\pi^{c-1}(G)=G/P_1(G)\to\pi^c(G)=G/P_0(G)=G/G\simeq 1$$

ending in the trivial group $\pi^c(G)=1$. The last but one quotient of the maximal path of $G$ is the elementary abelian p-group $\pi^{c-1}(G)=G/P_1(G)\simeq C_p^d$ of rank $d=d(G)$, where $d(G)=\dim_{\mathbb{F}_p}(H^1(G,\mathbb{F}_p))$ denotes the generator rank of $G$.

Generally, the descendant tree $\mathcal{T}(G)$ of a vertex $G$ is the subtree of all descendants of $G$, starting at the root $G$. The maximal possible descendant tree $\mathcal{T}(1)$ of the trivial group $1$ contains all finite p-groups and is exceptional, since the trivial group $1$ has all the infinitely many elementary abelian p-groups with varying generator rank $d\ge 1$ as its immediate descendants. However, any non-trivial finite p-group (of order divisible by $p$) possesses only finitely many immediate descendants.

== p-covering group, p-multiplicator and nucleus ==
Let $G$ be a finite p-group with $d$ generators. Our goal is to compile a complete list of pairwise non-isomorphic immediate descendants of $G$. It turns out that all immediate descendants can be obtained as quotients of a certain extension $G^{\ast}$ of $G$ which is called the p-covering group of $G$ and can be constructed in the following manner.

We can certainly find a presentation of $G$ in the form of an exact sequence

$(9)\qquad 1\longrightarrow R\longrightarrow F\longrightarrow G\longrightarrow 1$,

where $F$ denotes the free group with $d$ generators and $\vartheta:\ F\longrightarrow G$ is an epimorphism with kernel $R:=\ker(\vartheta)$. Then $R\triangleleft F$ is a normal subgroup of $F$ consisting of the defining relations for $G\simeq F/R$. For elements $r\in R$ and $f\in F$, the conjugate $f^{-1}rf\in R$ and thus also the commutator $\lbrack r,f\rbrack=r^{-1}f^{-1}rf\in R$ are contained in $R$. Consequently, $R^{\ast}:=\lbrack R,F\rbrack\cdot R^p$ is a characteristic subgroup of $R$, and the p-multiplicator $R/R^{\ast}$ of $G$ is an elementary abelian p-group, since

$(10)\qquad \lbrack R,R\rbrack\cdot R^p\le\lbrack R,F\rbrack\cdot R^p=R^{\ast}$.

Now we can define the p-covering group of $G$ by

$(11)\qquad G^{\ast}:=F/R^{\ast}$,

and the exact sequence

$(12)\qquad 1\longrightarrow R/R^{\ast}\longrightarrow F/R^{\ast}\longrightarrow F/R\longrightarrow 1$

shows that $G^{\ast}$ is an extension of $G$ by the elementary abelian p-multiplicator. We call

$(13)\qquad \mu(G):=\dim_{\mathbb{F}_p}(R/R^{\ast})$

the p-multiplicator rank of $G$.

Let us assume now that the assigned finite p-group $G\simeq F/R$ is of p-class $\mathrm{cl}_p(G)=c$. Then the conditions $R\triangleleft F$ and $\mathrm{cl}_p(F/R)=c$ imply $P_c(F)\le R$, according to the rule (R3), and we can define the nucleus of $G$ by

$(14)\qquad P_c(G^{\ast})=P_c(F)\cdot R^{\ast}/R^{\ast}\le R/R^{\ast}$

as a subgroup of the p-multiplicator. Consequently, the nuclear rank

$(15)\qquad \nu(G):=\dim_{\mathbb{F}_p}(P_c(G^{\ast}))\le\mu(G)$

of $G$ is bounded from above by the p-multiplicator rank.

== Allowable subgroups of the p-multiplicator ==
As before, let $G$ be a finite p-group with $d$ generators.

Proposition. Any p-elementary abelian central extension

$(16)\qquad 1\to Z\to H\to G\to 1$

of $G$ by a p-elementary abelian subgroup $Z\le\zeta_1(H)$ such that $d(H)=d(G)=d$ is a quotient of the p-covering group $G^{\ast}$ of $G$.

For the proof click show on the right hand side.

Proof

The reason is that, since $d(H)=d(G)=d$, there exists an epimorphism $\psi:\ F\to H$ such that $\vartheta=\omega\circ\psi$, where $\omega:\ H\to H/Z\simeq G$ denotes the canonical projection. Consequently, we have

$R=\ker(\vartheta)=\ker(\omega\circ\psi)=(\omega\circ\psi)^{-1}(1)=\psi^{-1}(\omega^{-1}(1))=\psi^{-1}(Z)$

and thus $\psi(R)=\psi(\psi^{-1}(Z))=Z$. Further, $\psi(R^p)=Z^p=1$, since $Z$ is p-elementary, and $\psi(\lbrack R,F\rbrack)=\lbrack Z,H\rbrack=1$, since $Z$ is central. Together this shows that $\psi(R^{\ast})=\psi(\lbrack R,F\rbrack\cdot R^p)=1$ and thus $\psi$ induces the desired epimorphism $\psi^\ast:\ G^{\ast}\to H$ such that $H\simeq G^{\ast}/\ker(\psi^\ast)$.

In particular, an immediate descendant $H$ of $G$ is a p-elementary abelian central extension

$(17)\qquad 1\to P_{c-1}(H)\to H\to G\to 1$

of $G$, since

$1=P_c(H)=\lbrack P_{c-1}(H),H\rbrack\cdot P_{c-1}(H)^p$ implies $P_{c-1}(H)^p=1$ and $P_{c-1}(H)\le\zeta_1(H)$,

where $c=\mathrm{cl}_p(H)$.

Definition. A subgroup $M/R^{\ast}\le R/R^{\ast}$ of the p-multiplicator of $G$ is called allowable if it is given by the kernel $M/R^{\ast}=\ker(\psi^\ast)$ of an epimorphism $\psi^\ast:\ G^{\ast}\to H$ onto an immediate descendant $H$ of $G$.

An equivalent characterization is that $1<M/R^{\ast}<R/R^{\ast}$ is a proper subgroup which supplements the nucleus

$(18)\qquad (M/R^{\ast})\cdot(P_c(F)\cdot R^{\ast}/R^{\ast})=R/R^{\ast}$.

Therefore, the first part of our goal to compile a list of all immediate descendants of $G$ is done, when we have constructed all allowable subgroups of $R/R^{\ast}$ which supplement the nucleus $P_c(G^{\ast})=P_c(F)\cdot R^{\ast}/R^{\ast}$, where $c=\mathrm{cl}_p(G)$. However, in general the list

$(19)\qquad \lbrace F/M\quad\mid\quad M/R^{\ast}\le R/R^{\ast}\text{ is allowable }\rbrace$,

where $G^{\ast}/(M/R^{\ast})=(F/R^{\ast})/(M/R^{\ast})\simeq F/M$, will be redundant, due to isomorphisms $F/M_1\simeq F/M_2$ among the immediate descendants.

== Orbits under extended automorphisms ==
Two allowable subgroups $M_1/R^{\ast}$ and $M_2/R^{\ast}$ are called equivalent if the quotients $F/M_1\simeq F/M_2$, that are the corresponding immediate descendants of $G$, are isomorphic.

Such an isomorphism $\varphi:\ F/M_1\to F/M_2$ between immediate descendants of $G=F/R$ with $c=\mathrm{cl}_p(G)$ has the property that $\varphi(R/M_1)=\varphi(P_c(F/M_1))=P_c(\varphi(F/M_1))=P_c(F/M_2)=R/M_2$ and thus induces an automorphism $\alpha\in\mathrm{Aut}(G)$ of $G$ which can be extended to an automorphism $\alpha^\ast\in\mathrm{Aut}(G^\ast)$ of the p-covering group $G^\ast=F/R^\ast$of $G$. The restriction of this extended automorphism $\alpha^\ast$ to the p-multiplicator $R/R^\ast$ of $G$ is determined uniquely by $\alpha$.

Since $\alpha^\ast(M/R^{\ast})\cdot P_c(F/R^{\ast})=\alpha^\ast\lbrack M/R^{\ast}\cdot P_c(F/R^{\ast})\rbrack=\alpha^\ast(R/R^\ast)=R/R^\ast$, each extended automorphism $\alpha^\ast\in\mathrm{Aut}(G^\ast)$ induces a permutation $\alpha^\prime$ of the allowable subgroups $M/R^{\ast}\le R/R^{\ast}$. We define $P:=\langle\alpha^\prime\mid\alpha\in\mathrm{Aut}(G)\rangle$ to be the permutation group generated by all permutations induced by automorphisms of $G$. Then the map $\mathrm{Aut}(G)\to P$, $\alpha\mapsto\alpha^\prime$ is an epimorphism and the equivalence classes of allowable subgroups $M/R^{\ast}\le R/R^{\ast}$ are precisely the orbits of allowable subgroups under the action of the permutation group $P$.

Eventually, our goal to compile a list $\lbrace F/M_i\mid 1\le i\le N\rbrace$ of all immediate descendants of $G$ will be done, when we select a representative $M_i/R^{\ast}$ for each of the $N$ orbits of allowable subgroups of $R/R^{\ast}$ under the action of $P$. This is precisely what the p-group generation algorithm does in a single step of the recursive procedure for constructing the descendant tree of an assigned root.

== Capable p-groups and step sizes ==
A finite p-group $G$ is called capable (or extendable) if it possesses at least one immediate descendant, otherwise it is terminal (or a leaf). The nuclear rank $\nu(G)$ of $G$ admits a decision about the capability of $G$:

- $G$ is terminal if and only if $\nu(G)=0$.
- $G$ is capable if and only if $\nu(G)\ge 1$.

In the case of capability, $G=F/R$ has immediate descendants of $\nu=\nu(G)$ different step sizes $1\le s\le\nu$, in dependence on the index $(R/R^\ast:M/R^\ast)=p^s$ of the corresponding allowable subgroup $M/R^\ast$ in the p-multiplicator $R/R^\ast$. When $G$ is of order $\vert G\vert=p^n$, then an immediate descendant of step size $s$ is of order $\#(F/M)=(F/R^\ast:M/R^\ast)=(F/R^\ast:R/R^\ast)\cdot (R/R^\ast:M/R^\ast)$ $=\#(F/R)\cdot p^s=\vert G\vert\cdot p^s=p^n\cdot p^s=p^{n+s}$.

For the related phenomenon of multifurcation of a descendant tree at a vertex $G$ with nuclear rank $\nu(G)\ge 2$ see the article on descendant trees.

The p-group generation algorithm provides the flexibility to restrict the construction of immediate descendants to those of a single fixed step size $1\le s\le\nu$, which is very convenient in the case of huge descendant numbers (see the next section).

== Numbers of immediate descendants ==
We denote the number of all immediate descendants, resp. immediate descendants of step size $s$, of $G$ by $N$, resp. $N_s$. Then we have $N=\sum_{s=1}^\nu\,N_s$. As concrete examples, we present some interesting finite metabelian p-groups with extensive sets of immediate descendants, using the SmallGroups identifiers and additionally pointing out the numbers $0\le C_s\le N_s$ of capable immediate descendants in the usual format $(N_1/C_1;\ldots;N_\nu/C_\nu)$ as given by actual implementations of the p-group generation algorithm in the computer algebra systems GAP and MAGMA.

First, let $p=3$.

We begin with groups having abelianization of type $(3,3)$. See Figure 4 in the article on descendant trees.

- The group $\langle 27,3\rangle$ of coclass $1$ has ranks $\nu=2$, $\mu=4$ and descendant numbers $(4/1;7/5)$, $N=11$.
- The group $\langle 243,3\rangle=\langle 27,3\rangle-\#2;1$ of coclass $2$ has ranks $\nu=2$, $\mu=4$ and descendant numbers $(10/6;15/15)$, $N=25$.
- One of its immediate descendants, the group $\langle 729,40\rangle=\langle 243,3\rangle-\#1;7$, has ranks $\nu=2$, $\mu=5$ and descendant numbers $(16/2;27/4)$, $N=43$.

In contrast, groups with abelianization of type $(3,3,3)$ are partially located beyond the limit of computability.

- The group $\langle 81,12\rangle$ of coclass $2$ has ranks $\nu=2$, $\mu=7$ and descendant numbers $(10/2;100/50)$, $N=110$.
- The group $\langle 243,37\rangle$ of coclass $3$ has ranks $\nu=5$, $\mu=9$ and descendant numbers $(35/3;2783/186;81711/10202;350652/202266;\ldots)$, $N>4\cdot 10^5$ unknown.
- The group $\langle 729,122\rangle$ of coclass $4$ has ranks $\nu=8$, $\mu=11$ and descendant numbers $(45/3;117919/1377;\ldots)$, $N>10^5$ unknown.

Next, let $p=5$.

Corresponding groups with abelianization of type $(5,5)$ have bigger descendant numbers than for $p=3$.

- The group $\langle 125,3\rangle$ of coclass $1$ has ranks $\nu=2$, $\mu=4$ and descendant numbers $(4/1;12/6)$, $N=16$.
- The group $\langle 3125,3\rangle=\langle 125,3\rangle-\#2;1$ of coclass $2$ has ranks $\nu=3$, $\mu=5$ and descendant numbers $(8/3;61/61;47/47)$, $N=116$.

== Schur multiplier ==
Via the isomorphism $\mathbb{Q}/\mathbb{Z}\to\mu_{\infty}$, $\frac{n}{d}\mapsto\exp\left(\frac{n}{d}\cdot 2\pi i\right)$ the quotient group $\mathbb{Q}/\mathbb{Z}=\left\lbrace\frac{n}{d}\cdot\mathbb{Z}\mid d\ge 1,\ 0\le n\le d-1\right\rbrace$ can be viewed as the additive analogue of the multiplicative group $\mu_{\infty}=\lbrace z\in\mathbb{C}\mid z^d=1 \text{ for some integer } d\ge 1\rbrace$ of all roots of unity.

Let $p$ be a prime number and $G$ be a finite p-group with presentation $G=F/R$ as in the previous section. Then the second cohomology group $M(G):=H^2(G,\mathbb{Q}/\mathbb{Z})$ of the $G$-module $\mathbb{Q}/\mathbb{Z}$ is called the Schur multiplier of $G$. It can also be interpreted as the quotient group $M(G)=(R\cap\lbrack F,F\rbrack)/\lbrack F,R\rbrack$.

I. R. Shafarevich has proved that the difference between the relation rank $r(G)=\dim_{\mathbb{F}_p}(H^2(G,\mathbb{F}_p))$ of $G$ and the generator rank $d(G)=\dim_{\mathbb{F}_p}(H^1(G,\mathbb{F}_p))$ of $G$ is given by the minimal number of generators of the Schur multiplier of $G$, that is $r(G)-d(G)=d(M(G))$.

N. Boston and H. Nover have shown that $\mu(G_j)-\nu(G_j)\le r(G)$, for all quotients $G_j:=G/P_j(G)$ of p-class $\mathrm{cl}_p(G_j)=j$, $j\ge 0$, of a pro-p group $G$ with finite abelianization $G/G^\prime$.

Furthermore, J. Blackhurst (in the appendix On the nucleus of certain p-groups of a paper by N. Boston, M. R. Bush and F. Hajir) has proved that a non-cyclic finite p-group $G$ with trivial Schur multiplier $M(G)$ is a terminal vertex in the descendant tree $\mathcal{T}(1)$ of the trivial group $1$, that is, $M(G)=1$ $\Rightarrow$ $\nu(G)=0$.

=== Examples ===
- A finite p-group $G$ has a balanced presentation $r(G)=d(G)$ if and only if $r(G)-d(G)=0=d(M(G))$, that is, if and only if its Schur multiplier $M(G)=1$ is trivial. Such a group is called a Schur group and it must be a leaf in the descendant tree $\mathcal{T}(1)$.
- A finite p-group $G$ satisfies $r(G)=d(G)+1$ if and only if $r(G)-d(G)=1=d(M(G))$, that is, if and only if it has a non-trivial cyclic Schur multiplier $M(G)$. Such a group is called a Schur+1 group.
