= Descendant tree (group theory) =

In mathematics, specifically group theory, a descendant tree is a hierarchical structure that visualizes parent-descendant relations between isomorphism classes of finite groups of prime power order $p^n$, for a fixed prime number $p$ and varying integer exponents $n\ge 0$. Such groups are briefly called finite p-groups. The vertices of a descendant tree are isomorphism classes of finite p-groups.

Additionally to their order $p^n$, finite p-groups have two further related invariants, the nilpotency class $c$ and the coclass $r=n-c$. It turned out that descendant trees of a particular kind, the so-called pruned coclass trees whose infinitely many vertices share a common coclass $r$, reveal a repeating finite pattern. These two crucial properties of finiteness and periodicity admit a characterization of all members of the tree by finitely many parametrized presentations. Consequently, descendant trees play a fundamental role in the classification of finite p-groups. By means of kernels and targets of Artin transfer homomorphisms, descendant trees can be endowed with additional structure.

An important question is how the descendant tree $\mathcal{T}(R)$ can actually be constructed for an assigned starting group which is taken as the root $R$ of the tree. The p-group generation algorithm is a recursive process for constructing the descendant tree of a given finite p-group playing the role of the tree root. This algorithm is implemented in the computational algebra systems GAP and Magma.

== Definitions and terminology ==
According to M. F. Newman, there exist several distinct definitions of the parent $\pi(G)$ of a finite p-group $G$. The common principle is to form the quotient $\pi(G)=G/N$ of $G$ by a suitable normal subgroup $N\triangleleft G$ which can be either

P

1. the centre $N=\zeta_1(G)$ of $G$, whence $\pi(G)=G/\zeta_1(G)$ is called the central quotient of $G$, or
2. the last non-trivial term $N=\gamma_c(G)$ of the lower central series of $G$, where $c$ denotes the nilpotency class of $G$, or
3. the last non-trivial term $N=P_{c-1}(G)$ of the lower exponent-p central series of $G$, where $c$ denotes the exponent-p class of $G$, or
4. the last non-trivial term $N=G^{(d-1)}$ of the derived series of $G$, where $d$ denotes the derived length of $G$.

In each case, $G$ is called an immediate descendant of $\pi(G)$ and a directed edge of the tree is defined either by $G\to\pi(G)$ in the direction of the canonical projection $\pi:G\to\pi(G)$ onto the quotient $\pi(G)=G/N$ or by $\pi(G)\to G$ in the opposite direction, which is more usual for descendant trees. The former convention is adopted by C. R. Leedham-Green and M. F. Newman, by M. du Sautoy and D. Segal, by C. R. Leedham-Green and S. McKay, and by B. Eick, C. R. Leedham-Green, M. F. Newman and E. A. O'Brien. The latter definition is used by M. F. Newman, by M. F. Newman and E. A. O'Brien, by M. du Sautoy, and by B. Eick and C. R. Leedham-Green.

In the following, the direction of the canonical projections is selected for all edges. Then, more generally, a vertex $R$ is a descendant of a vertex $P$, and $P$ is an ancestor of $R$, if either $R$ is equal to $P$ or there is a path

$(1)\qquad R=Q_0\to Q_1\to\cdots\to Q_{m-1}\to Q_m=P$, with $m\ge 1$,

of directed edges from $R$ to $P$. The vertices forming the path necessarily coincide with the iterated parents $Q_j=\pi^{j}(R)$ of $R$, with $0\le j\le m$:

$(2)\qquad R=\pi^{0}(R)\to\pi^{1}(R)\to\cdots\to\pi^{m-1}(R)\to\pi^{m}(R)=P$, with $m\ge 1$,

In the most important special case (P2) of parents defined as last non-trivial lower central quotients, they can also be viewed as the successive quotients $R/\gamma_{c+1-j}(R)$ of class $c-j$ of $R$ when the nilpotency class of $R$ is given by $c\ge m$:

$(3)\qquad R\simeq R/\gamma_{c+1}(R)\to R/\gamma_{c}(R)\to\cdots\to R/\gamma_{c+2-m}(R)\to R/\gamma_{c+1-m}(R)\simeq P$, with $c\ge m\ge 1$.

Generally, the descendant tree $\mathcal{T}(G)$ of a vertex $G$ is the subtree of all descendants of $G$, starting at the root $G$. The maximal possible descendant tree $\mathcal{T}(1)$ of the trivial group $1$ contains all finite p-groups and is somewhat exceptional, since, for any parent definition (P1–P4), the trivial group $1$ has infinitely many abelian p-groups as its immediate descendants. The parent definitions (P2–P3) have the advantage that any non-trivial finite p-group (of order divisible by $p$) possesses only finitely many immediate descendants.

== Pro-p groups and coclass trees ==
For a sound understanding of coclass trees as a particular instance of descendant trees, it is necessary to summarize some facts concerning infinite topological pro-p groups. The members $\gamma_j(S)$, with $j\ge 1$, of the lower central series of a pro-p group $S$ are closed (and open) subgroups of finite index, and therefore the corresponding quotients $S/\gamma_j(S)$ are finite p-groups. The pro-p group $S$ is said to be of coclass $\mathrm{cc}(S)=r$ when the limit $r=\lim_{j\to\infty}\,\mathrm{cc}(S/\gamma_j(S))$ of the coclass of the successive quotients exists and is finite. An infinite pro-p group $S$ of coclass $r$ is a p-adic pre-space group , since it has a normal subgroup $T$, the translation group, which is a free module over the ring $\mathbb{Z}_p$ of p-adic integers of uniquely determined rank $d$, the dimension, such that the quotient $P=S/T$ is a finite p-group, the point group, which acts on $T$ uniserially. The dimension is given by

$(4)\qquad d=(p-1)p^{s}$, with some $0\le s<r$.

A central finiteness result for infinite pro-p groups of coclass $r$ is provided by the so-called Theorem D, which is one of the five Coclass Theorems proved in 1994 independently by A. Shalev and by C. R. Leedham-Green , and conjectured in 1980 already by C. R. Leedham-Green and M. F. Newman. Theorem D asserts that there are only finitely many isomorphism classes of infinite pro-p groups of coclass $r$, for any fixed prime $p$ and any fixed non-negative integer $r$. As a consequence, if $S$ is an infinite pro-p group of coclass $r$, then there exists a minimal integer $i\ge 1$ such that the following three conditions are satisfied for any integer $j\ge i$.

S

1. $\mathrm{cc}(S/\gamma_j(S))=r$,
2. $S/\gamma_j(S)$ is not a lower central quotient of any infinite pro-p group of coclass $r$ which is not isomorphic to $S$,
3. $\gamma_j/\gamma_{j+1}(S)$ is cyclic of order $p$.

The descendant tree $\mathcal{T}(R)$, with respect to the parent definition (P2), of the root $R=S/\gamma_i(S)$ with minimal $i$ is called the coclass tree $\mathcal{T}(S)$ of $S$ and its unique maximal infinite (reverse-directed) path

$(5)\qquad R=S/\gamma_i(S)\leftarrow S/\gamma_{i+1}(S)\leftarrow S/\gamma_{i+2}(S)\leftarrow\cdots$

is called the mainline (or trunk) of the tree.

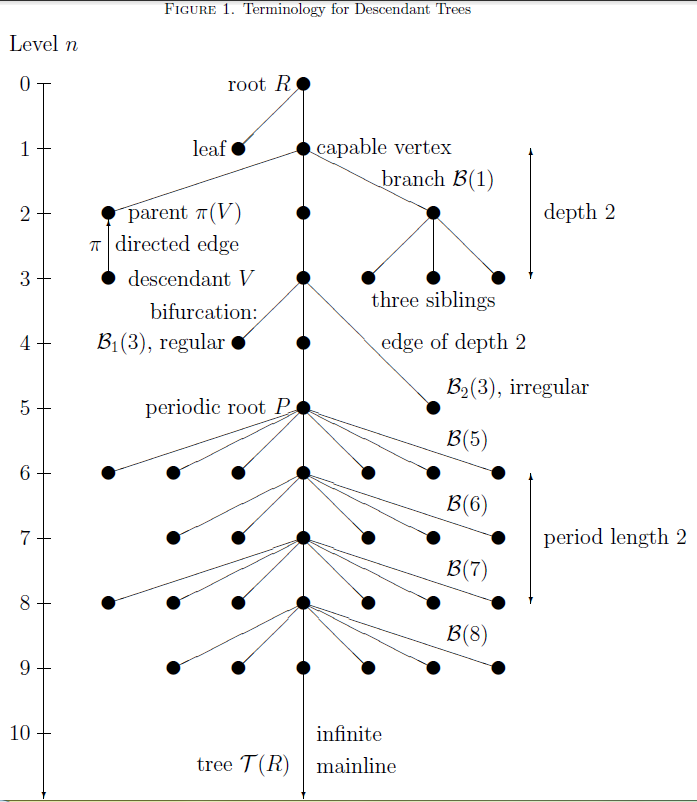
Figure 1: A descendant tree. The branches B(2),B(4) have depth 0, and B(5),B(7), resp. B(6),B(8), are isomorphic as trees.

== Tree diagram ==
Further terminology, used in diagrams visualizing finite parts of descendant trees, is explained in Figure 1 by means of an artificial abstract tree. On the left hand side, a level indicates the basic top-down design of a descendant tree. For concrete trees, such as those in Figure 2, resp. Figure 3, etc., the level is usually replaced by a scale of orders increasing from the top to the bottom. A vertex is capable (or extendable) if it has at least one immediate descendant, otherwise it is terminal (or a leaf). Vertices sharing a common parent are called siblings.

If the descendant tree is a coclass tree $\mathcal{T}(R)$ with root $R=R_0$ and with mainline vertices $(R_n)_{n\ge 0}$ labelled according to the level $n$, then the finite subtree defined as the difference set

$(6)\qquad \mathcal{B}(n)=\mathcal{T}(R_n)\setminus\mathcal{T}(R_{n+1})$

is called the nth branch (or twig) of the tree or also the branch $\mathcal{B}(R_n)$ with root $R_n$, for any $n\ge 0$. The depth of a branch is the maximal length of the paths connecting its vertices with its root. Figure 1 shows an artificial abstract coclass tree whose branches $\mathcal{B}(2)$ and $\mathcal{B}(4)$ both have depth $0$, and the branches $\mathcal{B}(5)\simeq\mathcal{B}(7)$ and $\mathcal{B}(6)\simeq\mathcal{B}(8)$ are pairwise isomorphic as graphs. If all vertices of depth bigger than a given integer $k\ge 0$ are removed from the branch $\mathcal{B}(n)$, then we obtain the depth-$k$ pruned branch $\mathcal{B}_k(n)$. Correspondingly, the depth-$k$ pruned coclass tree $\mathcal{T}_k(R)$, resp. the entire coclass tree $\mathcal{T}(R)$, consists of the infinite sequence of its pruned branches $(\mathcal{B}_k(n))_{n\ge 0}$, resp. branches $(\mathcal{B}(n))_{n\ge 0}$, connected by the mainline, whose vertices $R_n$ are called infinitely capable.

== Virtual periodicity ==
The periodicity of branches of depth-pruned coclass trees has been proved with analytic methods using zeta functions of groups by M. du Sautoy , and with algebraic techniques using cohomology groups by B. Eick and C. R. Leedham-Green . The former methods admit the qualitative insight of ultimate virtual periodicity, the latter techniques determine the quantitative structure.

Theorem. For any infinite pro-p group $S$ of coclass $r\ge 1$ and dimension $d$, and for any given depth $k\ge 1$, there exists an effective minimal lower bound $f(k)\ge 1$, where periodicity of length $d$ of pruned branches of the coclass tree $\mathcal{T}(S)$ sets in, that is, there exist graph isomorphisms

$(7)\qquad \mathcal{B}_k(n+d)\simeq\mathcal{B}_k(n)$ for all $n\ge f(k)$.

For the proof, click show on the right hand side.

Proof

The graph isomorphisms of depth-$k$ pruned branches with roots of sufficiently large order $n\ge f(k)$ are derived with cohomological methods in Theorem 6, p. 277 and Theorem 9, p. 278 by Eick and Leedham-Green and the effective lower bound $f(k)$ for the branch root orders is established in Theorem 29, p. 287, of this article.

These central results can be expressed ostensively: When we look at a coclass tree through a pair of blinkers and ignore a finite number of pre-periodic branches at the top, then we shall see a repeating finite pattern (ultimate periodicity). However, if we take wider blinkers the pre-periodic initial section may become longer (virtual periodicity).

The vertex $P=R_{f(k)}$ is called the periodic root of the pruned coclass tree, for a fixed value of the depth $k$. See Figure 1.

== Multifurcation and coclass graphs ==
Assume that parents of finite p-groups are defined as last non-trivial lower central quotients (P2). For a p-group $G$ of coclass $\mathrm{cc}(G)=r$, we can distinguish its (entire) descendant tree $\mathcal{T}(G)$ and its coclass-$r$ descendant tree $\mathcal{T}^r(G)$, that is the subtree consisting of descendants of coclass $r$ only. The group $G$ is called coclass-settled if $\mathcal{T}(G)=\mathcal{T}^r(G)$, i.e., if there are no descendants of $G$ with bigger coclass than $r$.

The nuclear rank $\nu(G)$ of $G$ in the theory of the p-group generation algorithm by M. F. Newman and E. A. O'Brien provides the following criteria.

N

1. $G$ is terminal, and thus trivially coclass-settled, if and only if $\nu(G)=0$.
2. If $\nu(G)=1$, then $G$ is capable, but it remains unknown whether $G$ is coclass-settled.
3. If $\nu(G)=m\ge 2$, then $G$ is capable and definitely not coclass-settled.

In the last case, a more precise assertion is possible: If $G$ has coclass $r$ and nuclear rank $\nu(G)=m\ge 2$, then it gives rise to an m-fold multifurcation into a regular coclass-r descendant tree $\mathcal{T}^r(G)$ and $m-1$ irregular descendant graphs $\mathcal{T}^{r+j}(G)$ of coclass $r+j$, for $1\le j\le m-1$. Consequently, the descendant tree of $G$ is the disjoint union

$(8)\qquad \mathcal{T}(G)=\dot{\cup}_{j=0}^{m-1}\,\mathcal{T}^{r+j}(G)$.

Multifurcation is correlated with different orders of the last non-trivial lower central of immediate descendants. Since the nilpotency class increases exactly by a unit, $c=\mathrm{cl}(Q)=\mathrm{cl}(P)+1$, from a parent $P=Q/\gamma_c(Q)=\pi(Q)$ to any immediate descendant $Q$, the coclass remains stable, $r=\mathrm{cc}(Q)=\mathrm{cc}(P)$, if the last non-trivial lower central is cyclic of order $\vert\gamma_c(Q)\vert=p$, since then the exponent of the order also increases exactly by a unit, $\vert Q\vert=p\cdot\vert P\vert$ . In this case, $Q$ is a regular immediate descendant with directed edge $P\leftarrow Q$ of step size $1$, as usual. However, the coclass increases by $m-1$, if $\vert\gamma_c(Q)\vert=p^m$ with $m\ge 2$. Then $Q$ is called an irregular immediate descendant with directed edge $P\leftarrow Q$ of step size $m$.

If the condition of step size $1$ is imposed on all directed edges, then the maximal descendant tree $\mathcal{T}(1)$ of the trivial group $1$ splits into a countably infinite disjoint union

$(9)\qquad \mathcal{T}(1)=\dot{\cup}_{r=0}^\infty\,\mathcal{G}(p,r)$

of directed coclass graphs $\mathcal{G}(p,r)$, which are rather forests than trees. More precisely, the above-mentioned Coclass Theorems imply that

$(10)\qquad \mathcal{G}(p,r)=\left(\dot{\cup}_i\,\mathcal{T}(S_i)\right)\dot{\cup}\mathcal{G}_0(p,r)$

is the disjoint union of finitely many coclass trees $\mathcal{T}(S_i)$ of pairwise non-isomorphic infinite pro-p groups $S_i$ of coclass $r$ (Theorem D) and a finite subgraph $\mathcal{G}_0(p,r)$ of sporadic groups lying outside of any coclass tree.

== Identifiers ==
The SmallGroups Library identifiers of finite groups, in particular of finite p-groups, given in the form

$\langle\ \text{order},\ \text{counting number}\ \rangle$

in the following concrete examples of descendant trees, are due to H. U. Besche, B. Eick and E. A. O'Brien . When the group orders are given in a scale on the left hand side, as in Figure 2 and Figure 3, the identifiers are briefly denoted by

$\langle\ \text{counting number}\ \rangle$.

Depending on the prime $p$, there is an upper bound on the order of groups for which a SmallGroup identifier exists, e.g. $512=2^9$ for $p=2$, and $6561=3^8$ for $p=3$. For groups of bigger orders, a notation with generalized identifiers resembling the descendant structure is employed. A regular immediate descendant, connected by an edge of step size $1$ with its parent $P$, is denoted by

$P-\#1;\text{counting number}$,

and an irregular immediate descendant, connected by an edge of step size $s\ge 2$ with its parent $P$, is denoted by

$P-\#s;\text{counting number}$.

The implementations of the p-group generation algorithm in the computational algebra systems GAP and Magma use these generalized identifiers, which go back to J. A. Ascione in 1979 .

== Concrete examples of trees ==
In all examples, the underlying parent definition (P2) corresponds to the usual lower central series. Occasional differences to the parent definition (P3) with respect to the lower exponent-p central series are pointed out.

=== Coclass 0 ===
The coclass graph

$(11)\qquad \mathcal{G}(p,0)=\mathcal{G}_0(p,0)$

of finite p-groups of coclass $0$ does not contain any coclass tree and thus exclusively consists of sporadic groups, namely the trivial group $1$ and the cyclic group $C_p$ of order $p$, which is a leaf (however, it is capable with respect to the lower exponent-p central series). For $p=2$ the SmallGroup identifier of $C_p$ is $\langle 2,1\rangle$, for $p=3$ it is $\langle 3,1\rangle$.

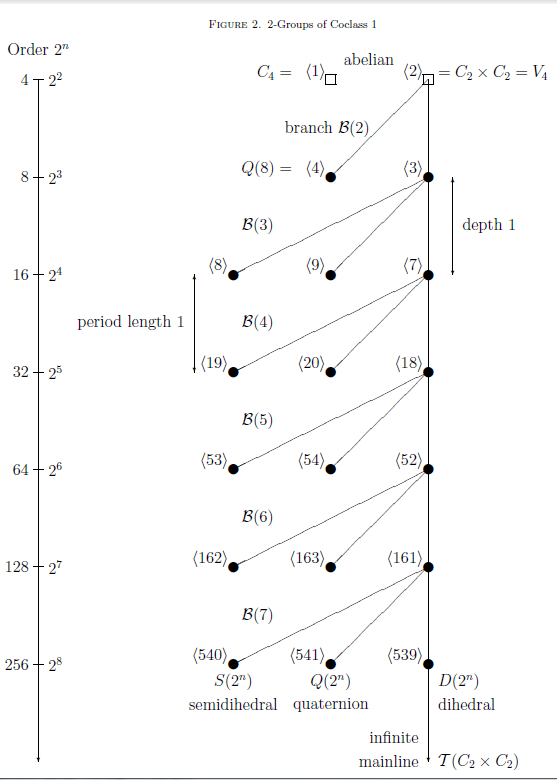
Figure 2: The coclass graph of finite 2-groups with coclass 1

=== Coclass 1 ===
The coclass graph

$(12)\qquad \mathcal{G}(p,1)=\mathcal{T}^1(R)\dot{\cup}\mathcal{G}_0(p,1)$

of finite p-groups of coclass $1$, also called of maximal class, consists of the unique coclass tree $\mathcal{T}^1(R)$ with root $R=C_p\times C_p$, the elementary abelian p-group of rank $2$, and a single isolated vertex (a terminal orphan without proper parent in the same coclass graph, since the directed edge to the trivial group $1$ has step size $2$), the cyclic group $C_{p^2}$ of order $p^2$ in the sporadic part $\mathcal{G}_0(p,1)$ (however, this group is capable with respect to the lower exponent-p central series). The tree $\mathcal{T}^1(R)=\mathcal{T}^1(S_1)$ is the coclass tree of the unique infinite pro-p group $S_1$ of coclass $1$.

For $p=2$, resp. $p=3$, the SmallGroup identifier of the root $R$ is $\langle 4,2\rangle$, resp. $\langle 9,2\rangle$, and a tree diagram of the coclass graph from branch $\mathcal{B}(2)$ down to branch $\mathcal{B}(7)$ (counted with respect to the p-logarithm of the order of the branch root) is drawn in Figure 2, resp. Figure 3, where all groups of order at least $p^3$ are metabelian, that is non-abelian with derived length $2$ (vertices represented by black discs in contrast to contour squares indicating abelian groups). In Figure 3, smaller black discs denote metabelian 3-groups where even the maximal subgroups are non-abelian, a feature which does not occur for the metabelian 2-groups in Figure 2, since they all possess an abelian subgroup of index $p$ (usually exactly one). The coclass tree of $\mathcal{G}(2,1)$, resp. $\mathcal{G}(3,1)$, has periodic root $\langle 8,3\rangle$ and periodicity of length $1$ starting with branch $\mathcal{B}(3)$, resp. periodic root $\langle 81,9\rangle$ and periodicity of length $2$ setting in with branch $\mathcal{B}(4)$. Both trees have branches of bounded depth $1$, so their virtual periodicity is in fact a strict periodicity.

However, the coclass tree of $\mathcal{G}(p,1)$ with $p\ge 5$ has unbounded depth and contains non-metabelian groups, and the coclass tree of $\mathcal{G}(p,1)$ with $p\ge 7$ has even unbounded width, that is, the number of descendants of a fixed order increases indefinitely with growing order .

With the aid of kernels and targets of Artin transfers, the diagrams in Figure 2 and Figure 3 can be endowed with additional information and redrawn as structured descendant trees.

The concrete examples $\mathcal{G}(2,1)$ and $\mathcal{G}(3,1)$ of coclass graphs provide an opportunity to give a parametrized polycyclic power-commutator presentation for the complete coclass tree $\mathcal{T}^1(R)\subset\mathcal{G}(p,1)$, $p\in\lbrace 2,3\rbrace$, mentioned in the lead section as a benefit of the descendant tree concept and as a consequence of the periodicity of the entire coclass tree. In both cases, a group $G\in\mathcal{T}^1(R)$ is generated by two elements $x,y$ but the presentation contains the series of higher commutators $s_j=\lbrack s_{j-1},x\rbrack$, $3\le j\le n-1=\mathrm{cl}(G)$, starting with the main commutator $s_2=\lbrack y,x\rbrack$. The nilpotency is formally expressed by the relation $s_n=1$, when the group is of order $\vert G\vert=p^n$.

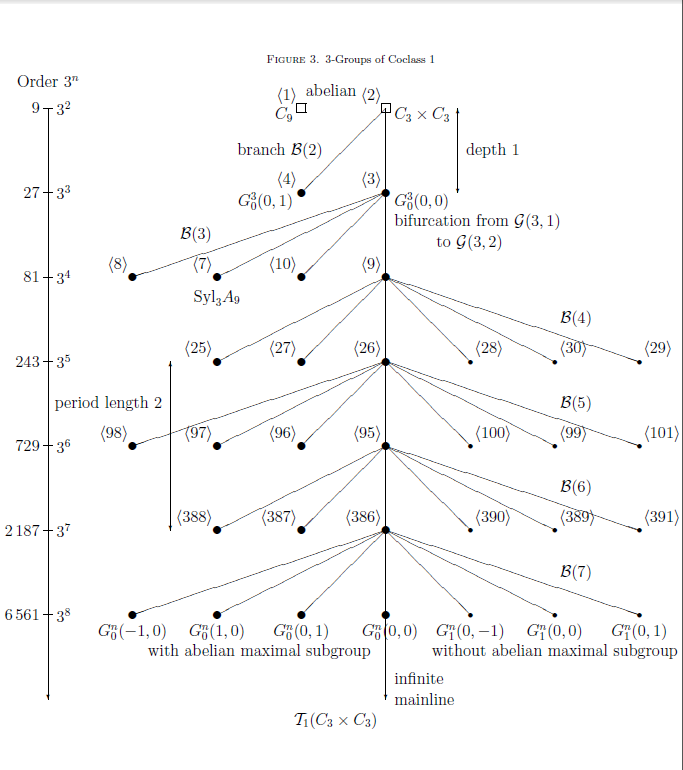
Figure 3: The coclass graph of finite 3-groups with coclass 1

For $p=2$, there are two parameters $0\le w,z\le 1$ and the pc-presentation is given by

(13)
$$\begin{align}G^n(z,w)= & \langle x,y,s_2,\ldots,s_{n-1}\mid\\
& x^2=s_{n-1}^w,\ y^2=s_2^{-1}s_{n-1}^z,\ \lbrack s_2,y\rbrack=1,\\
& s_2=\lbrack y,x\rbrack,\ s_j=\lbrack s_{j-1},x\rbrack\text{ for }3\le j\le n-1\rangle\end{align}$$

The 2-groups of maximal class, that is of coclass $1$, form three periodic infinite sequences,

- the dihedral groups, $D(2^n)=G^n(0,0)$, $n\ge 3$, forming the mainline (with infinitely capable vertices),
- the generalized quaternion groups, $Q(2^n)=G^n(0,1)$, $n\ge 3$, which are all terminal vertices,
- the semidihedral groups, $S(2^n)=G^n(1,0)$, $n\ge 4$, which are also leaves.

For $p=3$, there are three parameters $0\le a\le 1$ and $-1\le w,z\le 1$ and the pc-presentation is given by

(14)
$$\begin{align}G^n_a(z,w)= & \langle x,y,s_2,\ldots,s_{n-1}\mid\\
& x^3=s_{n-1}^w,\ y^3=s_2^{-3}s_3^{-1}s_{n-1}^z,\ \lbrack y,s_2\rbrack=s_{n-1}^a,\\
& s_2=\lbrack y,x\rbrack,\ s_j=\lbrack s_{j-1},x\rbrack\text{ for }3\le j\le n-1\rangle\end{align}$$

3-groups with parameter $a=0$ possess an abelian maximal subgroup, those with parameter $a=1$ do not. More precisely, an existing abelian maximal subgroup is unique, except for the two extra special groups $G^3_0(0,0)$ and $G^3_0(0,1)$, where all four maximal subgroups are abelian.

In contrast to any bigger coclass $r\ge 2$, the coclass graph $\mathcal{G}(p,1)$ exclusively contains p-groups $G$ with abelianization $G/G^\prime$ of type $(p,p)$, except for its unique isolated vertex $C_{p^2}$. The case $p=2$ is distinguished by the truth of the reverse statement: Any 2-group with abelianization of type $(2,2)$ is of coclass $1$ (O. Taussky's Theorem).

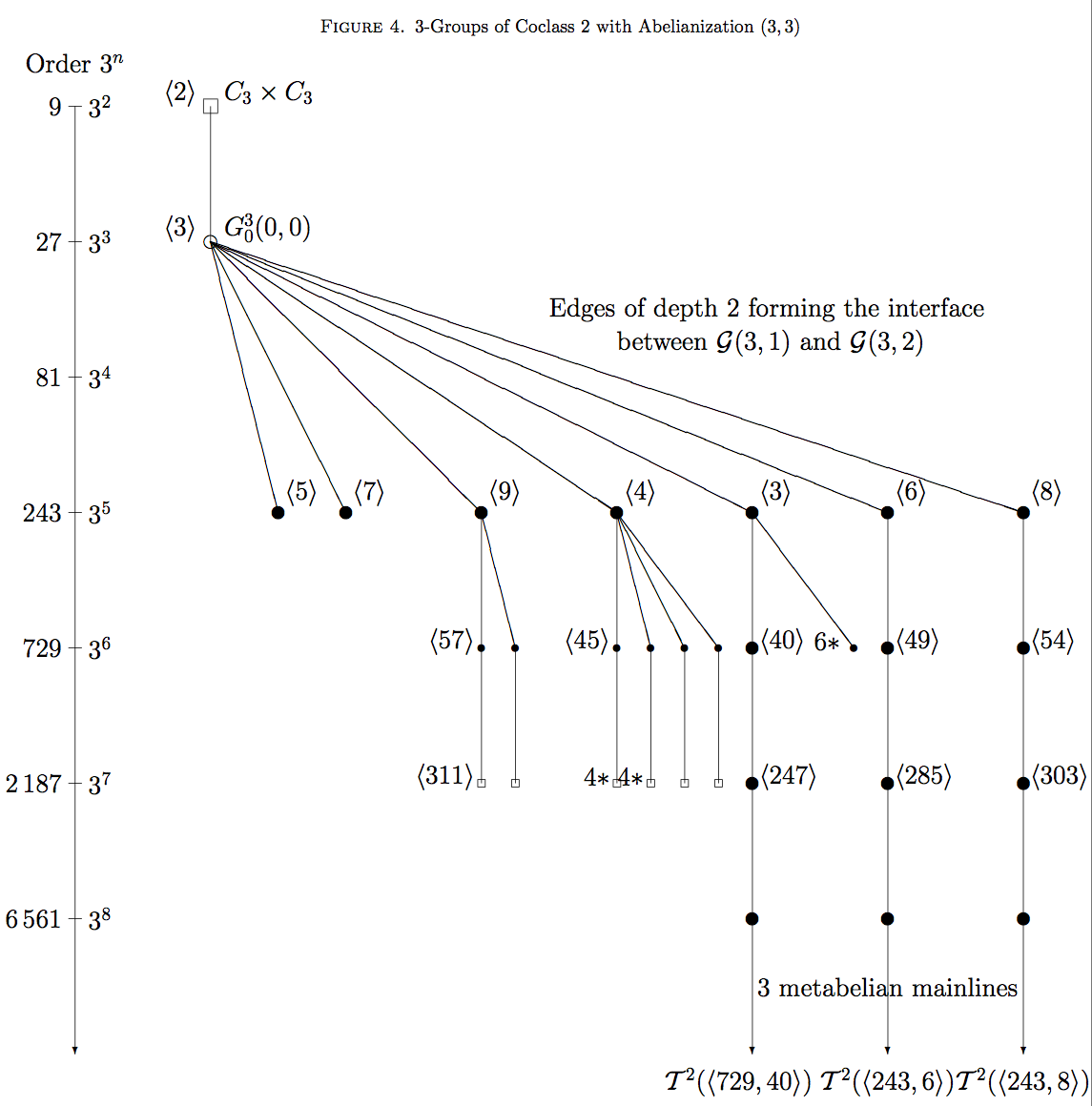
Figure 4: The interface between finite 3-groups of coclass 1 and 2 of type (3,3)

=== Coclass 2 ===
The genesis of the coclass graph $\mathcal{G}(p,r)$ with $r\ge 2$ is not uniform. p-groups with several distinct abelianizations contribute to its constitution. For coclass $r=2$, there are essential contributions from groups $G$ with abelianizations $G/G^\prime$ of the types $(p,p)$, $(p^2,p)$, $(p,p,p)$, and an isolated contribution by the cyclic group $C_{p^3}$ of order $p^3$:

$(15)\qquad \mathcal{G}(p,2)=\mathcal{G}_{(p,p)}(p,2)\dot{\cup}\mathcal{G}_{(p^2,p)}(p,2)\dot{\cup}\mathcal{G}_{(p,p,p)}(p,2)\dot{\cup}\mathcal{G}_{(p^3)}(p,2)$.

==== Abelianization of type (p,p) ====
As opposed to p-groups of coclass $2$ with abelianization of type $(p^2,p)$ or $(p,p,p)$, which arise as regular descendants of abelian p-groups of the same types, p-groups of coclass $2$ with abelianization of type $(p,p)$ arise from irregular descendants of a non-abelian p-group of coclass $1$ which is not coclass-settled.

For the prime $p=2$, such groups do not exist at all, since the 2-group $\langle 8,3\rangle$ is coclass settled, which is the deeper reason for Taussky's Theorem. This remarkable fact has been observed by Giuseppe Bagnera in 1898 already.

For odd primes $p\ge 3$, the existence of p-groups of coclass $2$ with abelianization of type $(p,p)$ is due to the fact that the group $G^3_0(0,0)$ is not coclass-settled. Its nuclear rank equals $2$, which gives rise to a bifurcation of the descendant tree $\mathcal{T}(G^3_0(0,0))$ into two coclass graphs. The regular component $\mathcal{T}^1(G^3_0(0,0))$ is a subtree of the unique tree $\mathcal{T}^1(C_p\times C_p)$ in the coclass graph $\mathcal{G}(p,1)$. The irregular component $\mathcal{T}^2(G^3_0(0,0))$ becomes a subgraph $\mathcal{G}=\mathcal{G}_{(p,p)}(p,2)$ of the coclass graph $\mathcal{G}(p,2)$ when the connecting edges of step size $2$ of the irregular immediate descendants of $G^3_0(0,0)$ are removed.

For $p=3$, this subgraph $\mathcal{G}$ is drawn in Figure 4, which shows the interface between finite 3-groups with coclass $1$ and $2$ of type $(3,3)$. $\mathcal{G}$ has seven top level vertices of three important kinds, all having order $243=3^5$, which have been discovered by G. Bagnera .

- Firstly, there are two terminal Schur σ-groups $\langle 243,5\rangle$ and $\langle 243,7\rangle$ in the sporadic part $\mathcal{G}_0(3,2)$ of the coclass graph $\mathcal{G}(3,2)$.
- Secondly, the two groups $G=\langle 243,4\rangle$ and $G=\langle 243,9\rangle$ are roots of finite trees $\mathcal{T}^2(G)$ in the sporadic part $\mathcal{G}_0(3,2)$. However, since they are not coclass-settled, the complete trees $\mathcal{T}(G)$ are infinite .
- Finally, the three groups $\langle 243,3\rangle$, $\langle 243,6\rangle$ and $\langle 243,8\rangle$ give rise to (infinite) coclass trees, e.g., $\mathcal{T}^2(\langle 729,40\rangle)$, $\mathcal{T}^2(\langle 243,6\rangle)$, $\mathcal{T}^2(\langle 243,8\rangle)$, each having a metabelian mainline, in the coclass graph $\mathcal{G}(3,2)$. None of these three groups is coclass-settled.

Displaying additional information on kernels and targets of Artin transfers, we can draw these trees as structured descendant trees.

Definition. Generally, a Schur group (called a closed group by I. Schur, who coined the concept) is a pro-p group $G$ whose relation rank $d_2(G)=\mathrm{dim}_{\mathbb{F}_p}(\mathrm{H}^2(G,\mathbb{F}_p))$ coincides with its generator rank $d_1(G)=\mathrm{dim}_{\mathbb{F}_p}(\mathrm{H}^1(G,\mathbb{F}_p))$. A σ-group is a pro-p group $G$ which possesses an automorphism $\sigma\in\mathrm{Aut}(G)$ inducing the inversion $x\mapsto x^{-1}$ on its abelianization $G/G^\prime$. A Schur σ-group is a Schur group $G$ which is also a σ-group and has a finite abelianization $G/G^\prime$.

$\langle 243,3\rangle$ is not root of a coclass tree,

since its immediate descendant $\langle 729,40\rangle$, which is root of a coclass tree with metabelian mainline vertices, has two siblings $\langle 729,35\rangle$, resp. $\langle 729,34\rangle$, which give rise to a single, resp. three, coclass tree(s) with non-metabelian mainline vertices having cyclic centres of order $3$ and branches of considerable complexity but nevertheless of bounded depth $5$.

Table 1: Quotients of the groups G=G(f,g,h)
Parameters $(f,g,h)$	Abelianization $G/G^\prime$	Class-2 quotient $G/\gamma_3(G)$	Class-3 quotient $G/\gamma_4(G)$	Class-4 quotient $G/\gamma_5(G)$
$(0,1,0)$	$(3,3)$	$\langle 27,3\rangle$	$\langle 243,3\rangle$	$\langle 729,40\rangle$
$(0,1,2)$	$(3,3)$	$\langle 27,3\rangle$	$\langle 243,6\rangle$	$\langle 729,49\rangle$
$(1,1,2)$	$(3,3)$	$\langle 27,3\rangle$	$\langle 243,8\rangle$	$\langle 729,54\rangle$
$(1,0,0)$	$(9,3)$	$\langle 81,3\rangle$	$\langle 243,15\rangle$	$\langle 729,79\rangle$
$(0,0,1)$	$(9,3)$	$\langle 81,3\rangle$	$\langle 243,17\rangle$	$\langle 729,84\rangle$
$(0,0,0)$	$(3,3,3)$	$\langle 81,12\rangle$	$\langle 243,53\rangle$	$\langle 729,395\rangle$

==== Pro-3 groups of coclass 2 with non-trivial centre ====
B. Eick, C. R. Leedham-Green, M. F. Newman and E. A. O'Brien have constructed a family of infinite pro-3 groups with coclass $2$ having a non-trivial centre of order $3$. The family members are characterized by three parameters $(f,g,h)$. Their finite quotients generate all mainline vertices with bicyclic centres of type $(3,3)$ of six coclass trees in the coclass graph $\mathcal{G}(3,2)$. The association of parameters to the roots of these six trees is given in Table 1, the tree diagrams, except for the abelianization $(3,3,3)$, are indicated in Figure 4 and Figure 5, and the parametrized pro-3 presentation is given by

(16)
$$\begin{align}G(f,g,h)= & \langle a,t,z\mid\\
& a^3=z^f,\ \lbrack t,t^a\rbrack=z^g,\ t^{1+a+a^2}=z^h,\\
& z^3=1,\ \lbrack z,a\rbrack=1,\ \lbrack z,t\rbrack=1\rangle\end{align}$$

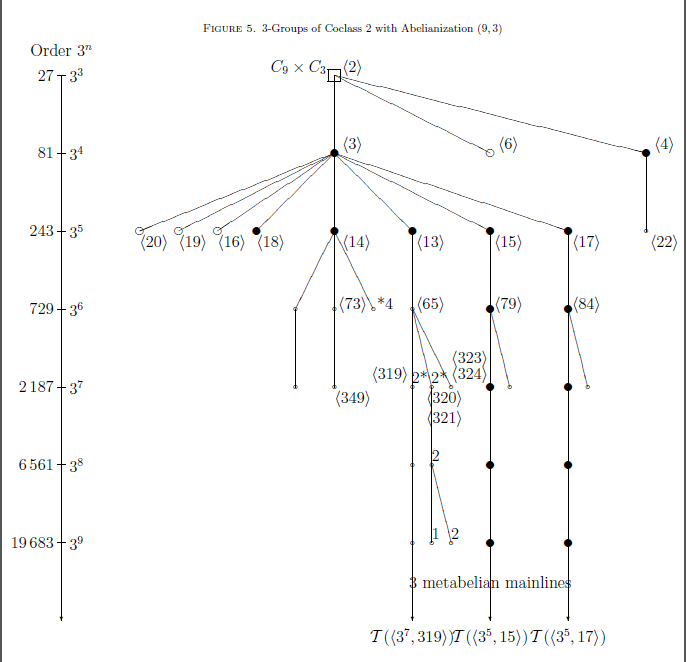
Figure 5: Finite 3-groups of coclass 2 of type (9,3)

==== Abelianization of type (p²,p) ====
For $p=3$, the top levels of the subtree $\mathcal{T}^2(\langle 27,2\rangle)$ of the coclass graph $\mathcal{G}(3,2)$ are drawn in Figure 5. The most important vertices of this tree are the eight siblings sharing the common parent $\langle 81,3\rangle$, which are of three important kinds.

- Firstly, there are three leaves $\langle 243,20\rangle$, $\langle 243,19\rangle$, $\langle 243,16\rangle$ having cyclic centre of order $9$, and a single leaf $\langle 243,18\rangle$ with bicyclic centre of type $(3,3)$.
- Secondly, the group $G=\langle 243,14\rangle$ is root of a finite tree $\mathcal{T}(G)=\mathcal{T}^2(G)$.
- Finally, the three groups $\langle 243,13\rangle$, $\langle 243,15\rangle$ and $\langle 243,17\rangle$ give rise to infinite coclass trees, e.g., $\mathcal{T}^2(\langle 2187,319\rangle)$, $\mathcal{T}^2(\langle 243,15\rangle)$, $\mathcal{T}^2(\langle 243,17\rangle)$, each having a metabelian mainline, the first with cyclic centres of order $3$, the second and third with bicyclic centres of type $(3,3)$.

Here, $\langle 243,13\rangle$ is not root of a coclass tree, since aside from its descendant $\langle 2187,319\rangle$, which is root of a coclass tree with metabelian mainline vertices, it possesses five further descendants which give rise to coclass trees with non-metabelian mainline vertices having cyclic centres of order $3$ and branches of extreme complexity, here partially even with unbounded depth.

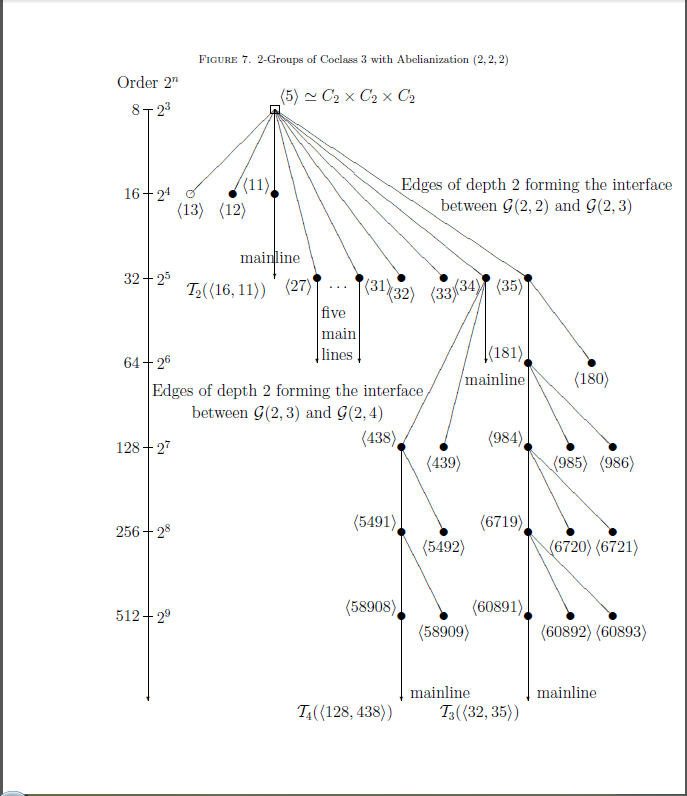
Figure 6: Finite 2-groups of coclass 2,3,4 and type (2,2,2)

==== Abelianization of type (p,p,p) ====
For $p=2$, resp. $p=3$, there exists a unique coclass tree with p-groups of type $(p,p,p)$ in the coclass graph $\mathcal{G}(p,2)$. Its root is the elementary abelian p-group of type $(p,p,p)$, that is, $\langle 8,5\rangle$, resp. $\langle 27,5\rangle$. This unique tree corresponds to the pro-2 group of the family $\#59$ by M. F. Newman and E. A. O'Brien, resp. to the pro-3 group given by the parameters $(f,g,h)=(0,0,0)$ in Table 1. For $p=2$, the tree is indicated in Figure 6, which shows some finite 2-groups with coclass $2,3,4$ of type $(2,2,2)$.

=== Coclass 3 ===
Here again, p-groups with several distinct abelianizations contribute to the constitution of the coclass graph $\mathcal{G}(p,3)$. There are regular, resp. irregular, essential contributions from groups $G$ with abelianizations $G/G^\prime$ of the types $(p^3,p)$, $(p^2,p^2)$, $(p^2,p,p)$, $(p,p,p,p)$, resp. $(p,p)$, $(p^2,p)$, $(p,p,p)$, and an isolated contribution by the cyclic group $C_{p^4}$ of order $p^4$.

==== Abelianization of type (p,p,p) ====
Since the elementary abelian p-group $C_p\times C_p\times C_p$ of rank $3$, that is, $\langle 8,5\rangle$, resp. $\langle 27,5\rangle$, for $p=2$, resp. $p=3$, is not coclass-settled, it gives rise to a multifurcation. The regular component $\mathcal{T}^2(C_p\times C_p\times C_p)$ has been described in the section about coclass $2$. The irregular component $\mathcal{T}^3(C_p\times C_p\times C_p)$ becomes a subgraph $\mathcal{G}=\mathcal{G}_{(p,p,p)}(p,3)$ of the coclass graph $\mathcal{G}(p,3)$ when the connecting edges of step size $2$ of the irregular immediate descendants of $C_p\times C_p\times C_p$ are removed.

For $p=2$, this subgraph $\mathcal{G}$ is contained in Figure 6. It has nine top level vertices of order $32=2^5$ which can be divided into terminal and capable vertices.

- The two groups $\langle 32,32\rangle$ and $\langle 32,33\rangle$ are leaves.
- The five groups $\langle 32,27..31\rangle$ and the two groups $\langle 32,34..35\rangle$ are infinitely capable.

The trees arising from the capable vertices are associated with infinite pro-2 groups by M. F. Newman and E. A. O'Brien in the following manner.

$\langle 32,28\rangle$ gives rise to two trees,

$\mathcal{T}^3(\langle 64,140\rangle)$ associated with family $\#73$, and

$\mathcal{T}^3(\langle 64,147\rangle)$ associated with family $\#74$.

$\mathcal{T}^3(\langle 32,29\rangle)$ is associated with family $\#75$.

$\mathcal{T}^3(\langle 32,30\rangle)$ is associated with family $\#76$.

$\mathcal{T}^3(\langle 32,31\rangle)$ is associated with family $\#77$.

$\langle 32,34\rangle$ gives rise to

$\mathcal{T}^3(\langle 64,174\rangle)$ associated with family $\#78$. Finally,

$\mathcal{T}^3(\langle 32,35\rangle)$ is associated with family $\#79$.

Table 2: Class-2 quotients Q of certain metabelian 2-groups G of type (2,2,2)
SmallGroups identifier of Q	Hall Senior classification of Q	Schur multiplier $\mathcal{M}(Q)$	2-rank of G' $r_2(G^\prime)$	4-rank of G' $r_4(G^\prime)$	Maximum of $r_2(H_i/H_i^\prime)$
$\langle 32,32\rangle$	32.040	$(2)$	$2$	$0$	$2$
$\langle 32,33\rangle$	32.041	$(2)$	$2$	$0$	$2$
$\langle 32,29\rangle$	32.037	$(2,2)$	$2$	$1$	$3$
$\langle 32,30\rangle$	32.038	$(2,2)$	$2$	$1$	$3$
$\langle 32,35\rangle$	32.035	$(2,2)$	$2$	$1$	$3$
$\langle 32,28\rangle$	32.036	$(2,2,2)$	$2$	$2$	$3$
$\langle 32,27\rangle$	32.033	$(2,2,2,2)$	$3$	$2$ or $3$	$4$

==== Hall-Senior classification of 2-groups ====
Seven of these nine top level vertices have been investigated by E. Benjamin, F. Lemmermeyer and C. Snyder with respect to their occurrence as class-2 quotients $Q=G/\gamma_3(G)$ of bigger metabelian 2-groups $G$ of type $(2,2,2)$ and with coclass $3$, which are exactly the members of the descendant trees of the seven vertices. These authors use the classification of 2-groups by M. Hall and J. K. Senior which is put in correspondence with the SmallGroups Library in Table 2. The complexity of the descendant trees of these seven vertices increases with the 2-ranks and 4-ranks indicated in Table 2, where the maximal subgroups of index $2$ in $G$ are denoted by $H_i$, for $1\le i\le 7$.

== History ==
Descendant trees with central quotients as parents (P1) are implicit in P. Hall's 1940 paper about isoclinism of groups. Trees with last non-trivial lower central quotients as parents (P2) were first presented by C. R. Leedham-Green at the International Congress of Mathematicians in Vancouver, 1974 . The first extensive tree diagrams have been drawn manually by J. A. Ascione, G. Havas and C. R. Leedham-Green (1977) , by J. A. Ascione (1979) , and by B. Nebelung (1989) . In the former two cases, the parent definition by means of the lower exponent-p central series (P3) was adopted in view of computational advantages, in the latter case, where theoretical aspects were focussed, the parents were taken with respect to the usual lower central series (P2).

== See also ==
- The kernels and targets of Artin transfers have recently turned out to be compatible with parent-descendant relations between finite p-groups and can favourably be used to endow descendant trees with additional structure.
