= Splitting of prime ideals in Galois extensions =

Aspect of algebraic number theory

In mathematics, the interplay between the Galois group G of a Galois extension L of a number field K, and the way the prime ideals P of the ring of integers O_{K} factorise as products of prime ideals of O_{L}, provides one of the richest parts of algebraic number theory. The splitting of prime ideals in Galois extensions is sometimes attributed to David Hilbert by calling it Hilbert theory. There is a geometric analogue, for ramified coverings of Riemann surfaces, which is simpler in that only one kind of subgroup of G need be considered, rather than two. This was certainly familiar before Hilbert.

== Definitions ==
Let L/K be a finite extension of number fields, and let O_{K} and O_{L} be the corresponding ring of integers of K and L, respectively, which are defined to be the integral closure of the integers Z in the field in question.

$$\begin{array}{ccc} O_K & \hookrightarrow & O_L \\ \downarrow & & \downarrow \\ K & \hookrightarrow & L \end{array}$$

Finally, let p be a non-zero prime ideal in O_{K}, or equivalently, a maximal ideal, so that the residue O_{K}/p is a field.

From the basic theory of one-dimensional rings follows the existence of a unique decomposition

$$pO_L = \prod_{j=1}^{g} P_j^{e_j}$$

of the ideal pO_{L} generated in O_{L} by p into a product of distinct maximal ideals P_{j}, with multiplicities e_{j}.

The field F = O_{K}/p naturally embeds into F_{j} = O_{L}/P_{j} for every j, the degree f_{j} = [O_{L}/P_{j} : O_{K}/p] of this residue field extension is called inertia degree of P_{j} over p.

The multiplicity e_{j} is called ramification index of P_{j} over p. If it is bigger than 1 for some j, the field extension L/K is called ramified at p (or we say that p ramifies in L, or that it is ramified in L). Otherwise, L/K is called unramified at p. If this is the case then by the Chinese remainder theorem the quotient O_{L}/pO_{L} is a product of fields F_{j}. The extension L/K is ramified in exactly those primes that divide the relative discriminant, hence the extension is unramified in all but finitely many prime ideals.

Multiplicativity of ideal norm implies

$$[L:K]=\sum_{j=1}^{g} e_j f_j.$$

If f_{j} = e_{j} = 1 for every j (and thus g = [L : K]), we say that p splits completely in L. If g = 1 and f_{1} = 1 (and so e_{1} = [L : K]), we say that p ramifies completely in L. Finally, if g = 1 and e_{1} = 1 (and so f_{1} = [L : K]), we say that p is inert in L.

=== The Galois situation ===
In the following, the extension L/K is assumed to be a Galois extension. Then the prime avoidance lemma can be used to show the Galois group $G=\operatorname{Gal}(L/K)$ acts transitively on the P_{j}. That is, the prime ideal factors of p in L form a single orbit under the automorphisms of L over K. From this and the unique factorisation theorem, it follows that f = f_{j} and e = e_{j} are independent of j; something that certainly need not be the case for extensions that are not Galois. The basic relations then read

$$pO_L = \left(\prod_{j=1}^{g} P_j\right)^e$$.

and

$$[L:K]=efg.$$

The relation above shows that [L : K]/ef equals the number g of prime factors of p in O_{L}. By the orbit-stabilizer formula this number is also equal to |G|/|D_{P_{j}}| for every j, where D_{P_{j}}, the decomposition group of P_{j}, is the subgroup of elements of G sending a given P_{j} to itself. Since the degree of L/K and the order of G are equal by basic Galois theory, it follows that the order of the decomposition group D_{P_{j}} is ef for every j.

This decomposition group contains a subgroup I_{P_{j}}, called inertia group of P_{j}, consisting of automorphisms of L/K that induce the identity automorphism on F_{j}. In other words, I_{P_{j}} is the kernel of reduction map $D_{P_j}\to\operatorname{Gal}(F_j/F)$. It can be shown that this map is surjective, and it follows that $\operatorname{Gal}(F_j/F)$ is isomorphic to D_{P_{j}}/I_{P_{j}} and the order of the inertia group I_{P_{j}} is e.

The theory of the Frobenius element goes further, to identify an element of D_{P_{j}} / I_{P_{j}} for given j which corresponds to the Frobenius automorphism in the Galois group of the finite field extension F_{j} / F. In the unramified case the order of D_{P_{j}} is f and I_{P_{j}} is trivial, so the Frobenius element is in this case an element of D_{P_{j}}, and thus also an element of G. For varying j, the groups D_{P_{j}} are conjugate subgroups inside G: Recalling that G acts transitively on the P_{j}, one checks that if σ maps P_{j} to P_{j′}, $\sigma D_{P_j} \sigma^{-1} = D_{P_{j'}}$. Therefore, if G is an abelian group, the Frobenius element of an unramified prime P does not depend on which P_{j} we take. Furthermore, in the abelian case, associating an unramified prime of K to its Frobenius and extending multiplicatively defines a homomorphism from the group of unramified ideals of K into G. This map, known as the Artin map, is a crucial ingredient of class field theory, which studies the finite abelian extensions of a given number field K.

In the geometric analogue, for complex manifolds or algebraic geometry over an algebraically closed field, the concepts of decomposition group and inertia group coincide. There, given a Galois ramified cover, all but finitely many points have the same number of preimages.

The splitting of primes in extensions that are not Galois may be studied by using a splitting field initially, i.e. a Galois extension that is somewhat larger. For example, cubic fields usually are 'regulated' by a degree 6 field containing them.

== Example — the Gaussian integers ==
This section describes the splitting of prime ideals in the field extension Q(i)/Q. That is, we take K = Q and L = Q(i), so O_{K} is simply Z, and O_{L} = Z[i] is the ring of Gaussian integers. Although this case is far from representative — after all, Z[i] has unique factorisation, and there aren't many imaginary quadratic fields with unique factorization — it exhibits many of the features of the theory.

Writing G for the Galois group of Q(i)/Q, and σ for the complex conjugation automorphism in G, there are three cases to consider.

=== The prime p = 2 ===
The prime 2 of Z ramifies in Z[i]:

$$(2)=(1+i)^2$$

The ramification index here is therefore e = 2. The residue field is

$$O_L / (1+i)O_L$$

which is the finite field with two elements. The decomposition group must be equal to all of G, since there is only one prime of Z[i] above 2. The inertia group is also all of G, since

$$a+bi\equiv a-bi\bmod1+i$$

for any integers a and b, as $a+bi = 2bi + a-bi =(1+i) \cdot (1-i)bi + a-bi \equiv a-bi \bmod 1+i$ .

In fact, 2 is the only prime that ramifies in Z[i], since every prime that ramifies must divide the discriminant of Z[i], which is −4.

=== Primes p ≡ 1 mod 4 ===
Any prime p ≡ 1 mod 4 splits into two distinct prime ideals in Z[i]; this is a manifestation of Fermat's theorem on sums of two squares. For example:

$$13=(2+3i)(2-3i)$$

The decomposition groups in this case are both the trivial group {1}; indeed the automorphism σ switches the two primes (2 + 3i) and (2 − 3i), so it cannot be in the decomposition group of either prime. The inertia group, being a subgroup of the decomposition group, is also the trivial group. There are two residue fields, one for each prime,

$$O_L / (2 \pm 3i)O_L\ ,$$

which are both isomorphic to the finite field with 13 elements. The Frobenius element is the trivial automorphism; this means that

$$(a+bi)^{13}\equiv a + bi\bmod2\pm3i$$

for any integers a and b.

=== Primes p ≡ 3 mod 4 ===
Any prime p ≡ 3 mod 4 remains inert in Z[i]; that is, it does not split. For example, (7) remains prime in Z[i]. In this situation, the decomposition group is all of G, again because there is only one prime factor. However, this situation differs from the p = 2 case, because now σ does not act trivially on the residue field

$$O_L / (7)O_L\ ,$$

which is the finite field with 7^{2} = 49 elements. For example, the difference between $1+i$ and $\sigma(1 + i) = 1 - i$ is $2i$, which is certainly not divisible by 7. Therefore, the inertia group is the trivial group {1}. The Galois group of this residue field over the subfield Z/7Z has order 2, and is generated by the image of the Frobenius element. The Frobenius element is none other than σ; this means that

$$(a+bi)^7\equiv a-bi\bmod7$$

for any integers a and b.

=== Summary ===
Prime in Z	How it splits in Z[i]	Inertia group	Decomposition group
2	Ramifies with index 2	G	G
p ≡ 1 mod 4	Splits into two distinct factors	1	1
p ≡ 3 mod 4	Remains inert	1	G

== Computing the factorisation ==
Suppose that we wish to determine the factorisation of a prime ideal P of O_{K} into primes of O_{L}. The following procedure (Neukirch, p. 47) solves this problem in many cases. The strategy is to select an integer θ in O_{L} so that L is generated over K by θ (such a θ is guaranteed to exist by the primitive element theorem), and then to examine the minimal polynomial H(X) of θ over K; it is a monic polynomial with coefficients in O_{K}. Reducing the coefficients of H(X) modulo P, we obtain a monic polynomial h(X) with coefficients in F, the (finite) residue field O_{K}/P. Suppose that h(X) factorises in the polynomial ring F[X] as

$$h(X) = h_1(X)^{e_1} \cdots h_n(X)^{e_n},$$

where the h_{j} are distinct monic irreducible polynomials in F[X]. Then, as long as P is not one of finitely many exceptional primes (the precise condition is described below), the factorisation of P has the following form:

$$P O_L = Q_1^{e_1} \cdots Q_n^{e_n},$$

where the Q_{j} are distinct prime ideals of O_{L}. Furthermore, the inertia degree of each Q_{j} is equal to the degree of the corresponding polynomial h_{j}, and there is an explicit formula for the Q_{j}:

$$Q_j = P O_L + h_j(\theta) O_L,$$

where h_{j} denotes here a lifting of the polynomial h_{j} to K[X].

In the Galois case, the inertia degrees are all equal, and the ramification indices e_{1} = ... = e_{n} are all equal.

The exceptional primes, for which the above result does not necessarily hold, are the ones not relatively prime to the conductor of the ring O_{K}[θ]. The conductor is defined to be the ideal

$$\{ y \in O_L : yO_L \subseteq O_K[\theta]\};$$

it measures how far the order O_{K}[θ] is from being the whole ring of integers (maximal order) O_{L}.

A significant caveat is that there exist examples of L/K and P such that there is no available θ that satisfies the above hypotheses (see for example). Therefore, the algorithm given above cannot be used to factor such P, and more sophisticated approaches must be used, such as that described in.

=== An example ===
Consider again the case of the Gaussian integers. We take θ to be the imaginary unit $i$, with minimal polynomial H(X) = X^{2} + 1. Since Z[$i$] is the whole ring of integers of Q($i$), the conductor is the unit ideal, so there are no exceptional primes.

For P = (2), we need to work in the field Z/(2)Z, which amounts to factorising the polynomial X^{2} + 1 modulo 2:

$$X^2 + 1 = (X+1)^2 \pmod 2.$$

Therefore, there is only one prime factor, with inertia degree 1 and ramification index 2, and it is given by

$$Q = (2)\mathbf Z[i] + (i+1)\mathbf Z[i] = (1+i)\mathbf Z[i].$$

The next case is for P = (p) for a prime p ≡ 3 mod 4. For concreteness we will take P = (7). The polynomial X^{2} + 1 is irreducible modulo 7. Therefore, there is only one prime factor, with inertia degree 2 and ramification index 1, and it is given by

$$Q = (7)\mathbf Z[i] + (i^2 + 1)\mathbf Z[i] = 7\mathbf Z[i].$$

The last case is P = (p) for a prime p ≡ 1 mod 4; we will again take P = (13). This time we have the factorisation

$$X^2 + 1 = (X + 5)(X - 5) \pmod{13}.$$

Therefore, there are two prime factors, both with inertia degree and ramification index 1. They are given by

$$Q_1 = (13)\mathbf Z[i] + (i + 5)\mathbf Z[i] = \cdots = (2+3i)\mathbf Z[i]$$

and

$$Q_2 = (13)\mathbf Z[i] + (i - 5)\mathbf Z[i] = \cdots = (2-3i)\mathbf Z[i].$$

== See also ==
- Chebotarev's density theorem
