= Cubic field =

In mathematics, specifically the area of algebraic number theory, a cubic field is an algebraic number field of degree three.

== Definition ==
If K is a field extension of the rational numbers Q of degree [K:Q] = 3, then K is called a cubic field. Any such field is isomorphic to a field of the form

$$\mathbf{Q}[x]/(f(x))$$

where f is an irreducible cubic polynomial with coefficients in Q. If f has three real roots, then K is called a totally real cubic field and it is an example of a totally real field. If, on the other hand, f has a non-real root, then K is called a complex cubic field.

A cubic field K is called a cyclic cubic field if it contains all three roots of its generating polynomial f. Equivalently, K is a cyclic cubic field if it is a Galois extension of Q, in which case its Galois group over Q is cyclic of order three. This can only happen if K is totally real. It is a rare occurrence in the sense that if the set of cubic fields is ordered by discriminant, then the proportion of cubic fields which are cyclic approaches zero as the bound on the discriminant approaches infinity.

A cubic field is called a pure cubic field if it can be obtained by adjoining the real cube root $\sqrt[3]{n}$ of a cube-free positive integer n to the rational number field Q. Such fields are always complex cubic fields since each positive number has two complex non-real cube roots.

== Examples ==
- Adjoining the real cube root of 2 to the rational numbers gives the cubic field $\mathbf{Q}(\sqrt[3]{2})$. This is an example of a pure cubic field, and hence of a complex cubic field. In fact, of all pure cubic fields, it has the smallest discriminant (in absolute value), namely −108.
- The complex cubic field obtained by adjoining to Q a root of x^{3} + x^{2} − 1 is not pure. It has the smallest discriminant (in absolute value) of all cubic fields, namely −23.
- Adjoining a root of x^{3} + x^{2} − 2x − 1 to Q yields a cyclic cubic field, and hence a totally real cubic field. It has the smallest discriminant of all totally real cubic fields, namely 49.
- The field obtained by adjoining to Q a root of x^{3} + x^{2} − 3x − 1 is an example of a totally real cubic field that is not cyclic. Its discriminant is 148, the smallest discriminant of a non-cyclic totally real cubic field.
- No cyclotomic fields are cubic because the degree of a cyclotomic field is equal to φ(n), where φ is Euler's totient function, which only takes on even values except for φ(1) = φ(2) = 1.

== Galois closure ==
A cyclic cubic field K is its own Galois closure with Galois group Gal(K/Q) isomorphic to the cyclic group of order three. However, any other cubic field K is a non-Galois extension of Q and has a field extension N of degree two as its Galois closure. The Galois group Gal(N/Q) is isomorphic to the symmetric group S_{3} on three letters.

== Associated quadratic field ==
The discriminant of a cubic field K can be written uniquely as df^{2} where d is a fundamental discriminant. Then, K is cyclic if and only if d = 1, in which case the only subfield of the Galois closure of K is Q itself. If d ≠ 1 then the Galois closure N of K contains a unique quadratic field k whose discriminant is d (in the case d = 1, the subfield Q is sometimes considered as the "degenerate" quadratic field of discriminant 1). The conductor of N over k is f, and f^{2} is the relative discriminant of N over K. The discriminant of N is d^{3}f^{4}.

The field K is a pure cubic field if and only if d = −3. This is the case for which the quadratic field contained in the Galois closure of K is the cyclotomic field of cube roots of unity.

== Discriminant ==
The blue crosses are the number of totally real cubic fields of bounded discriminant. The black line is the asymptotic distribution to first order whereas the green line includes the second order term.

The blue crosses are the number of complex cubic fields of bounded discriminant. The black line is the asymptotic distribution to first order whereas the green line includes the second order term.

Since the sign of the discriminant of a number field K is (−1)^{r_{2}}, where r_{2} is the number of conjugate pairs of complex embeddings of K into C, the discriminant of a cubic field will be positive precisely when the field is totally real, and negative if it is a complex cubic field.

Given some real number N > 0 there are only finitely many cubic fields K whose discriminant D_{K} satisfies |D_{K}| ≤ N. Formulae are known which calculate the prime decomposition of D_{K}, and so it can be explicitly calculated.

Unlike quadratic fields, several non-isomorphic cubic fields K_{1}, ..., K_{m} may share the same discriminant D. The number m of these fields is called the multiplicity of the discriminant D. Some small examples are m = 2 for D = −1836, 3969, m = 3 for D = −1228, 22356, m = 4 for D = −3299, 32009, and m = 6 for D = −70956, 3054132.

Any cubic field K will be of the form K = Q(θ) for some number θ that is a root of an irreducible polynomial

$$f(X)=X^3-aX+b$$

where a and b are integers. The discriminant of f is Δ = 4a^{3} − 27b^{2}. Denoting the discriminant of K by D, the index i(θ) of θ is then defined by Δ = i(θ)^{2}D.

In the case of a non-cyclic cubic field K this index formula can be combined with the conductor formula D = f^{2}d to obtain a decomposition of the polynomial discriminant Δ = i(θ)^{2}f^{2}d into the square of the product i(θ)f and the discriminant d of the quadratic field k associated with the cubic field K, where d is squarefree up to a possible factor 2^{2} or 2^{3}. Georgy Voronoy gave a method for separating i(θ) and f in the square part of Δ.

The study of the number of cubic fields whose discriminant is less than a given bound is a current area of research. Let N^{+}(X) (respectively N^{−}(X)) denote the number of totally real (respectively complex) cubic fields whose discriminant is bounded by X in absolute value. In the early 1970s, Harold Davenport and Hans Heilbronn determined the first term of the asymptotic behaviour of N^{±}(X) (i.e. as X goes to infinity). By means of an analysis of the residue of the Shintani zeta function, combined with a study of the tables of cubic fields compiled by Karim Belabas (Belabas 1997) and some heuristics, David P. Roberts conjectured a more precise asymptotic formula:

$$N^\pm(X)\sim\frac{A_\pm}{12\zeta(3)}X+\frac{4\zeta(\frac{1}{3})B_\pm}{5\Gamma(\frac{2}{3})^3\zeta(\frac{5}{3})}X^{\frac{5}{6}}$$

where A_{±} = 1 or 3, B_{±} = 1 or $\sqrt{3}$, according to the totally real or complex case, ζ(s) is the Riemann zeta function, and Γ(s) is the Gamma function. Proofs of this formula have been published by Bhargava, Shankar & Tsimerman (2013) using methods based on Bhargava's earlier work, as well as by Taniguchi & Thorne (2013) based on the Shintani zeta function.

== Unit group ==
According to Dirichlet's unit theorem, the torsion-free unit rank r of an algebraic number field K with r_{1} real embeddings and r_{2} pairs of conjugate complex embeddings is determined by the formula r = r_{1} + r_{2} − 1. Hence a totally real cubic field K with r_{1} = 3, r_{2} = 0 has two independent units ε_{1}, ε_{2} and a complex cubic field K with r_{1} = r_{2} = 1 has a single fundamental unit ε_{1}. These fundamental systems of units can be calculated by means of generalized continued fraction algorithms by Voronoi, which have been interpreted geometrically by Delone and Faddeev.
