= Discriminant of an algebraic number field =

Measure of the size of the ring of integers

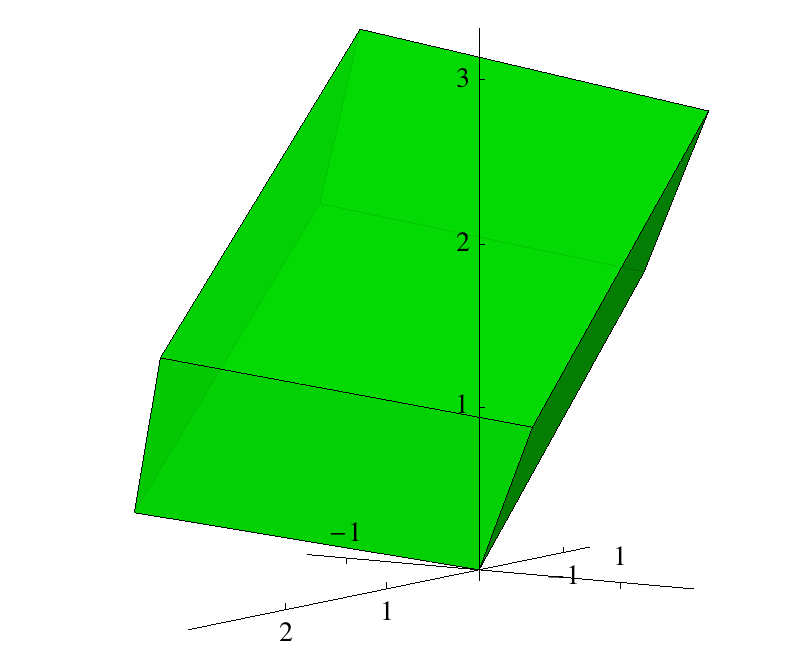
A fundamental domain of the ring of integers of the field K obtained from Q by adjoining a root of x^{3} − x^{2} − 2x + 1. This fundamental domain sits inside K ⊗_{Q} R. The discriminant of K is 49 = 7^{2}. Accordingly, the volume of the fundamental domain is 7 and K is only ramified at 7.

In mathematics, the discriminant of an algebraic number field is a numerical invariant that, loosely speaking, measures the size of the (ring of integers of the) algebraic number field. More specifically, it is proportional to the squared volume of the fundamental domain of the ring of integers, and it regulates which primes are ramified.

The discriminant is one of the most basic invariants of a number field, and occurs in several important analytic formulas such as the functional equation of the Dedekind zeta function of $K$, and the analytic class number formula for $K$. A theorem of Hermite states that there are only finitely many number fields of bounded discriminant, however determining this quantity is still an open problem, and the subject of current research.

The discriminant of $K$ can be referred to as the absolute discriminant of $K$ to distinguish it from the relative discriminant of an extension $K/L$ of number fields. The latter is an ideal in the ring of integers of $L$, and like the absolute discriminant it indicates which primes are ramified in $K/L$. It is a generalization of the absolute discriminant allowing for $L$ to be bigger than $\Q$; in fact, when $L=\Q$, the relative discriminant of $K/\Q$ is the principal ideal of $\Z$ generated by the absolute discriminant of $K$.

== Definition ==
Let $K$ be an algebraic number field, and let $\mathcal{O}_K$ be its ring of integers. Let $b_1,\dots,b_n$ be an integral basis of $\mathcal{O}_K$ (i.e. a basis as a $\Z$-module), and let $\{\sigma_1,\dots,\sigma_n\}$ be the set of embeddings of $K$ into the complex numbers (i.e. injective ring homomorphisms $K\to\C$). The discriminant of $K$ is the square of the determinant of the $n\times n$ matrix $B$ whose $(i,j)$-entry is $\sigma_i(b_j)$. Symbolically,

$$\Delta_K=\det\left(\begin{array}{cccc}
\sigma_1(b_1) & \sigma_1(b_2) &\cdots & \sigma_1(b_n) \\
\sigma_2(b_1) & \ddots & & \vdots \\
\vdots & & \ddots & \vdots \\
\sigma_n(b_1) & \cdots & \cdots & \sigma_n(b_n)
\end{array}\right)^2.$$

Equivalently, the trace from $K$ to $\Q$ can be used. Specifically, define the trace form to be the matrix whose $(i,j)$-entry is $\operatorname{Tr}_{K/\Q}(b_ib_j)$. This matrix equals $B^T\!B$, so defining the discriminant of $K$ as the determinant of this matrix gives us the same result as the preceding definition.

The discriminant of an order in $K$ with integral basis $b_1,\dots,b_n$ is defined in the same way.

== Examples ==
- Quadratic number fields: let $d$ be a square-free integer; then the discriminant of $K=\Q(\sqrt{d})$ is

$$\Delta_K=\left\{\begin{array}{ll} d &\text{if }d\equiv 1\pmod 4 \\ 4d &\text{if }d\equiv 2,3\pmod 4. \\\end{array}\right.$$

An integer that occurs as the discriminant of a quadratic number field is called a fundamental discriminant.

- Cyclotomic fields: let $n>2$ be an integer, let $\zeta_n$ be a primitive n-th root of unity, and let $K_n=\Q(\zeta_n)$ be the $n$-th cyclotomic field. The discriminant of $K_n$ is given by

$$\Delta_{K_n} = (-1)^{\varphi(n)/2} \frac{n^{\varphi(n)}}{\displaystyle\prod_{p|n} p^{\varphi(n)/(p-1)}}$$

where $\varphi(n)$ is Euler's totient function, and the product in the denominator is over primes $p$ dividing $n$.

- Power bases: In the case where the ring $\mathcal{O}_K$ of algebraic integers has a power integral basis, that is, can be written as $\mathcal{O}_K=\Z[\alpha]$, the discriminant of $K$ is equal to the discriminant of the minimal polynomial of $\alpha$. To see this, one can choose the integral basis of $\mathcal{O}_K$ to be

$$b_1=1, b_2=\alpha, b_3=\alpha^2, \dots,b_n = \alpha^{n-1}$$.

Then, the matrix $B$ in the definition is the Vandermonde matrix associated to $\alpha_i=\sigma_i(\alpha)$, whose squared determinant is

$$\prod_{1\leq i<j\leq n}(\alpha_i-\alpha_j)^2$$,

which is exactly the definition of the discriminant of the minimal polynomial.

- Let $K=\Q(\alpha)$ be the number field obtained by adjoining a root $\alpha$ of the polynomial $x^3-x^2-2x-8$. This is Richard Dedekind's original example of a number field whose ring of integers does not possess a power basis. An integral basis is given by

$$\left\{1,\alpha,\frac{\alpha(\alpha+1)}{2}\right\}$$

and the discriminant of $K$ is −503.

- Repeated discriminants: the discriminant of a quadratic field uniquely identifies it, but this is not true, in general, for higher-degree number fields. For example, there are two non-isomorphic cubic fields of discriminant 3969. They are obtained by adjoining a root of the polynomial $x^3-21x+28$ or $x^3-21x-35$, respectively.

== Basic results ==
- Brill's theorem: The sign of the discriminant is $(-1)^{r_2}$ where $r_2$ is the number of complex places of $K$.
- A prime $p$ ramifies in $K$ if and only if $p$ divides $\Delta_K$.
- Stickelberger's theorem:

$$\Delta_K\equiv 0\text{ or }1 \pmod 4.$$

- Minkowski's bound: Let $n$ denote the degree of the extension $K/\Q$ and $r_2$ the number of complex places of $K$, then

$$|\Delta_K|^{1/2}\geq \frac{n^n}{n!}\left(\frac{\pi}{4}\right)^{r_2} \geq \frac{n^n}{n!}\left(\frac{\pi}{4}\right)^{n/2}.$$

- Minkowski's theorem: If $K$ is not $\Q$, then $|\Delta_K|>1$ (this follows directly from the Minkowski bound).
- Hermite–Minkowski theorem: Let $N$ be a positive integer. There are only finitely many (up to isomorphisms) algebraic number fields $K$ with $|\Delta_K|<N$. Again, this follows from the Minkowski bound together with Hermite's theorem (that there are only finitely many algebraic number fields with prescribed discriminant).

== History ==
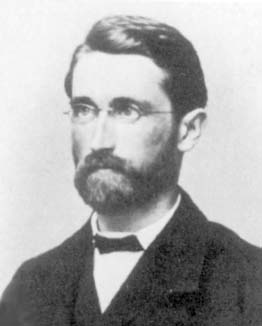
Richard Dedekind showed that every number field possesses an integral basis, allowing him to define the discriminant of an arbitrary number field.

The definition of the discriminant of a general algebraic number field, K, was given by Dedekind in 1871. At this point, he already knew the relationship between the discriminant and ramification.

Hermite's theorem predates the general definition of the discriminant with Charles Hermite publishing a proof of it in 1857. In 1877, Alexander von Brill determined the sign of the discriminant. Leopold Kronecker first stated Minkowski's theorem in 1882, though the first proof was given by Hermann Minkowski in 1891. In the same year, Minkowski published his bound on the discriminant. Near the end of the nineteenth century, Ludwig Stickelberger obtained his theorem on the residue of the discriminant modulo four.

== Relative discriminant ==
The discriminant defined above is sometimes referred to as the absolute discriminant of K to distinguish it from the relative discriminant Δ_{K/L} of an extension of number fields K/L, which is an ideal in O_{L}. The relative discriminant is defined in a fashion similar to the absolute discriminant, but must take into account that ideals in O_{L} may not be principal and that there may not be an O_{L} basis of O_{K}. Let {σ_{1}, ..., σ_{n}} be the set of embeddings of K into C which are the identity on L. If b_{1}, ..., b_{n} is any basis of K over L, let d(b_{1}, ..., b_{n}) be the square of the determinant of the n by n matrix whose (i,j)-entry is σ_{i}(b_{j}). Then, the relative discriminant of K/L is the ideal generated by the d(b_{1}, ..., b_{n}) as {b_{1}, ..., b_{n}} varies over all integral bases of K/L. (i.e. bases with the property that b_{i} ∈ O_{K} for all i.) Alternatively, the relative discriminant of K/L is the norm of the different of K/L. When L = Q, the relative discriminant Δ_{K/Q} is the principal ideal of Z generated by the absolute discriminant Δ_{K} . In a tower of fields K/L/F the relative discriminants are related by

$$\Delta_{K/F} = \mathcal{N}_{L/F}\left({\Delta_{K/L}}\right) \Delta_{L/F}^{[K:L]}$$

where $\mathcal{N}$ denotes relative norm.

=== Ramification ===
The relative discriminant regulates the ramification data of the field extension K/L. A prime ideal p of L ramifies in K if, and only if, it divides the relative discriminant Δ_{K/L}. An extension is unramified if, and only if, the discriminant is the unit ideal. The Minkowski bound above shows that there are no non-trivial unramified extensions of Q. Fields larger than Q may have unramified extensions: for example, for any field with class number greater than one, its Hilbert class field is a non-trivial unramified extension.

== Root discriminant ==
The root discriminant of a degree n number field K is defined by the formula

$\operatorname{rd}_K = |\Delta_K|^{1/n}.$

The relation between relative discriminants in a tower of fields shows that the root discriminant does not change in an unramified extension.

=== Asymptotic lower bounds ===
Given nonnegative rational numbers ρ and σ, not both 0, and a positive integer n such that the pair (r,2s) = (ρn,σn) is in Z × 2Z, let α_{n}(ρ, σ) be the infimum of rd_{K} as K ranges over degree n number fields with r real embeddings and 2s complex embeddings, and let α(ρ, σ) = liminf_{n→∞}α_{n}(ρ, σ). Then

$$\alpha(\rho,\sigma) \ge 60.8^\rho 22.3^\sigma$$,

and the generalized Riemann hypothesis implies the stronger bound

$\alpha(\rho,\sigma) \ge 215.3^\rho 44.7^\sigma .$

There is also a lower bound that holds in all degrees, not just asymptotically: For totally real fields, the root discriminant is > 14, with 1229 exceptions.

=== Asymptotic upper bounds ===
On the other hand, the existence of an infinite class field tower can give upper bounds on the values of α(ρ, σ). For example, the infinite class field tower over Q(√-m) with m = 3·5·7·11·19 produces fields of arbitrarily large degree with root discriminant 2√m ≈ 296.276, so α(0,1) < 296.276. Using tamely ramified towers, Hajir and Maire have shown that α(1,0) < 954.3 and α(0,1) < 82.2, improving upon earlier bounds of Martinet.

== Relation to other quantities ==
- When embedded into $K\otimes_\mathbf{Q}\mathbf{R}$, the volume of the fundamental domain of O_{K} is $\sqrt{|\Delta_K|}$ (sometimes a different measure is used and the volume obtained is $2^{-r_2}\sqrt{|\Delta_K|}$, where r_{2} is the number of complex places of K).
- Due to its appearance in this volume, the discriminant also appears in the functional equation of the Dedekind zeta function of K, and hence in the analytic class number formula, and the Brauer–Siegel theorem.
- The relative discriminant of K/L is the Artin conductor of the regular representation of the Galois group of K/L. This provides a relation to the Artin conductors of the characters of the Galois group of K/L, called the conductor-discriminant formula.
