= Tsen (disambiguation) =

Tsen may refer to several Chinese language surname:

- Surname 曾, see Zeng
  - Chiungtze C. Tsen, or Tsen Chiung-tze, Chinese mathematician
    - Tsen rank
    - Tsen's theorem
  - Linda Tsen, Malaysian politician
- surname 程, see Cheng (surname)
  - Tsen Shui Fang, known for her WWII dairy in The Undaunted Women of Nanking: The Wartime Diaries of Minnie Vautrin and Tsen Shui-Fang published by Southern Illinois University Press
- surname 鄭, see Zheng (surname)
  - Lindel Tsen, Chinese bishop of the Anglican Church in China
