= Kähler differential =

Differential form in commutative algebra

In mathematics, Kähler differentials provide an adaptation of differential forms to arbitrary commutative rings or schemes. The notion was introduced by Erich Kähler in the 1930s. It was adopted as standard in commutative algebra and algebraic geometry somewhat later, once the need was felt to adapt methods from calculus and geometry over the complex numbers to contexts where such methods are not available.

== Definition ==
Let R and S be commutative rings and φ : R → S be a ring homomorphism. An important example is for R a field and S a unital algebra over R (such as the coordinate ring of an affine variety). Kähler differentials formalize the observation that the derivatives of polynomials are again polynomial. In this sense, differentiation is a notion which can be expressed in purely algebraic terms. This observation can be turned into a definition of the module

$$\Omega_{S/R}$$

of differentials in different, but equivalent ways.

=== Definition using derivations ===
An R-linear derivation on S is an R-module homomorphism $d : S \to M$ to an S-module M satisfying the Leibniz rule $d(fg) = f\,dg + g\,df$ (it automatically follows from this definition that the image of R is in the kernel of d). The module of Kähler differentials is defined as the S-module $\Omega_{S/R}$ for which there is a universal derivation $d : S \to \Omega_{S/R}$. As with other universal properties, this means that d is the best possible derivation in the sense that any other derivation may be obtained from it by composition with an S-module homomorphism. In other words, the composition with d provides, for every S-module M, an S-module isomorphism

$$\operatorname{Hom}_S(\Omega_{S/R},M) \xrightarrow{\cong} \operatorname{Der}_R(S,M).$$

One construction of Ω_{S/R} and d proceeds by constructing a free S-module with one formal generator ds for each s in S, and imposing the relations

- dr = 0,
- d(s + t) = ds + dt,
- d(st) = s dt + t ds,

for all r in R and all s and t in S. The universal derivation sends s to ds. The relations imply that the universal derivation is a homomorphism of R-modules.

=== Definition using the augmentation ideal ===
Another construction proceeds by letting I be the ideal in the tensor product $S \otimes_R S$ defined as the kernel of the multiplication map

$$\begin{cases} S \otimes_R S\to S \\ \sum s_i \otimes t_i \mapsto \sum s_i\cdot t_i \end{cases}$$

Then the module of Kähler differentials of S can be equivalently defined by

$$\Omega_{S/R} = I/I^2,$$

and the universal derivation is the homomorphism d defined by

$$ds = 1 \otimes s - s \otimes 1.$$

This construction is equivalent to the previous one because I is the kernel of the projection

$$\begin{cases} S \otimes_R S\to S \otimes_R R \\ \sum s_i \otimes t_i \mapsto \sum s_i \cdot t_i \otimes 1 \end{cases}$$

Thus we have:

$$S \otimes_R S \equiv I \oplus S \otimes_R R.$$

Then $S \otimes_R S / S \otimes_R R$ may be identified with I by the map induced by the complementary projection

$$\sum s_i \otimes t_i \mapsto \sum s_i \otimes t_i - \sum s_i\cdot t_i \otimes 1.$$

This identifies I with the S-module generated by the formal generators ds for s in S, subject to d being a homomorphism of R-modules which sends each element of R to zero. Taking the quotient by I^{2} precisely imposes the Leibniz rule.

== Examples and basic facts ==
For any commutative ring R, the Kähler differentials of the polynomial ring $S=R[t_1, \dots, t_n]$ are a free S-module of rank n generated by the differentials of the variables:

$$\Omega^1_{R[t_1, \dots, t_n]/R} = \bigoplus_{i=1}^n R[t_1, \dots t_n] \, dt_i.$$

Kähler differentials are compatible with extension of scalars, in the sense that for a second R-algebra R′ and $S' = S \otimes_R R'$, there is an isomorphism

$$\Omega_{S/R} \otimes_S S' \cong \Omega_{ S'/R'}.$$

As a particular case of this, Kähler differentials are compatible with localizations, meaning that if W is a multiplicative set in S, then there is an isomorphism

$$W^{-1}\Omega_{S/R} \cong \Omega_{W^{-1}S/R}.$$

Given two ring homomorphisms $R \to S \to T$, there is a short exact sequence of T-modules

$$\Omega_{S/R} \otimes_S T \to \Omega_{T/R} \to \Omega_{T/S} \to 0.$$

If $T=S/I$ for some ideal I, the term $\Omega_{T/S}$ vanishes and the sequence can be continued at the left as follows:

$$I/I^2 \xrightarrow{[f] \mapsto df \otimes 1} \Omega_{S/R} \otimes_S T \to \Omega_{T/R} \to 0.$$

A generalization of these two short exact sequences is provided by the cotangent complex.

The latter sequence and the above computation for the polynomial ring allows the computation of the Kähler differentials of finitely generated R-algebras $T=R[t_1, \ldots, t_n]/(f_1, \ldots, f_m)$. Briefly, these are generated by the differentials of the variables and have relations coming from the differentials of the equations. For example, for a single polynomial in a single variable,

$$\Omega_{(R[t]/(f)) / R} \cong (R[t]\,dt \otimes R[t]/(f)) / (df) \cong R[t]/(f, df/dt)\,dt.$$

== Kähler differentials for schemes ==
Because Kähler differentials are compatible with localization, they may be constructed on a general scheme by performing either of the two definitions above on affine open subschemes and gluing. However, the second definition has a geometric interpretation that globalizes immediately. In this interpretation, I represents the ideal defining the diagonal in the fiber product of Spec(S) with itself over Spec(S) → Spec(R). This construction therefore has a more geometric flavor, in the sense that the notion of first infinitesimal neighbourhood of the diagonal is thereby captured, via functions vanishing modulo functions vanishing at least to second order (see cotangent space for related notions). Moreover, it extends to a general morphism of schemes $f : X \to Y$ by setting $\mathcal{I}$ to be the ideal of the diagonal in the fiber product $X \times_Y X$. The cotangent sheaf $\Omega_{X/Y} = \mathcal{I} / \mathcal{I}^2$, together with the derivation $d: \mathcal{O}_X \to \Omega_{X/Y}$ defined analogously to before, is universal among $f^{-1}\mathcal{O}_Y$-linear derivations of $\mathcal{O}_X$-modules. If U is an open affine subscheme of X whose image in Y is contained in an open affine subscheme V, then the cotangent sheaf restricts to a sheaf on U which is similarly universal. It is therefore the sheaf associated to the module of Kähler differentials for the rings underlying U and V.

Similar to the commutative algebra case, there exist exact sequences associated to morphisms of schemes. Given morphisms $f:X\to Y$ and $g:Y\to Z$ of schemes there is an exact sequence of sheaves on $X$

$$f^*\Omega_{Y/Z} \to \Omega_{X/Z} \to \Omega_{X/Y} \to 0$$

Also, if $X \subset Y$ is a closed subscheme given by the ideal sheaf $\mathcal{I}$, then $\Omega_{X/Y}=0$ and there is an exact sequence of sheaves on $X$

$$\mathcal{I}/\mathcal{I}^2 \to \Omega_{Y/Z}|_X \to \Omega_{X/Z} \to 0$$

=== Examples ===
==== Finite separable field extensions ====
If $K/k$ is a finite field extension, then $\Omega^1_{K/k}=0$ if and only if $K/k$ is separable. Consequently, if $K/k$ is a finite separable field extension and $\pi:Y \to \operatorname{Spec}(K)$ is a smooth variety (or scheme), then the relative cotangent sequence

$$\pi^*\Omega^1_{K/k} \to \Omega^1_{Y/k} \to \Omega^1_{Y/K} \to 0$$

proves $\Omega^1_{Y/k} \cong \Omega^1_{Y/K}$.

==== Cotangent modules of a projective variety ====
Given a projective scheme $X\in \operatorname{Sch}/\mathbb{k}$, its cotangent sheaf can be computed from the sheafification of the cotangent module on the underlying graded algebra. For example, consider the complex curve

$$\operatorname{Proj}\left(\frac{\Complex[x,y,z]}{(x^n + y^n - z^n)} \right)=\operatorname{Proj}(R)$$

then we can compute the cotangent module as

$$\Omega_{R/\Complex} = \frac{R\cdot dx \oplus R \cdot dy \oplus R \cdot dz}{nx^{n-1}dx + ny^{n-1}dy - nz^{n-1}dz}$$

Then,

$$\Omega_{X/\Complex} = \widetilde{\Omega_{R/\Complex}}$$

==== Morphisms of schemes ====
Consider the morphism

$$X = \operatorname{Spec}\left( \frac{\Complex[t,x,y]}{(xy-t)} \right)=\operatorname{Spec}(R) \to \operatorname{Spec}(\Complex[t]) = Y$$

in $\operatorname{Sch}/\Complex$. Then, using the first sequence we see that

$$\widetilde{R\cdot dt} \to \widetilde{\frac{R\cdot dt \oplus R \cdot dx \oplus R \cdot dy}{ydx + xdy - dt}} \to \Omega_{X/Y} \to 0$$

hence

$$\Omega_{X/Y} = \widetilde{\frac{R \cdot dx \oplus R \cdot dy}{ydx + xdy}}$$

== Higher differential forms and algebraic de Rham cohomology ==
=== de Rham complex ===
As before, fix a map $X \to Y$. Differential forms of higher degree are defined as the exterior powers (over $\mathcal O_X$),

$$\Omega^n_{X/Y} := \bigwedge^n \Omega_{X/Y}.$$

The derivation $\mathcal O_X \to \Omega_{X/Y}$ extends in a natural way to a sequence of maps

$$0 \to \mathcal{O}_X \xrightarrow{d} \Omega^1_{X/Y} \xrightarrow{d} \Omega^2_{X/Y} \xrightarrow{d} \cdots$$

satisfying $d \circ d=0.$ This is a cochain complex known as the de Rham complex.

The de Rham complex enjoys an additional multiplicative structure, the wedge product

$$\Omega^n_{X/Y} \otimes \Omega^m_{X/Y} \to \Omega^{n+m}_{X/Y}.$$

This turns the de Rham complex into a commutative differential graded algebra. It also has a coalgebra structure inherited from the one on the exterior algebra.

=== de Rham cohomology ===
The hypercohomology of the de Rham complex of sheaves is called the algebraic de Rham cohomology of X over Y and is denoted by $H^n_\text{dR}(X / Y)$ or just $H^n_\text{dR}(X)$ if Y is clear from the context. (In many situations, Y is the spectrum of a field of characteristic zero.) Algebraic de Rham cohomology was introduced by Grothendieck (1966a). It is closely related to crystalline cohomology.

As is familiar from coherent cohomology of other quasi-coherent sheaves, the computation of de Rham cohomology is simplified when X = Spec S and Y = Spec R are affine schemes. In this case, because affine schemes have no higher cohomology, $H^n_\text{dR}(X / Y)$ can be computed as the cohomology of the complex of abelian groups

$$0 \to S \xrightarrow{d} \Omega^1_{S/R} \xrightarrow{d} \Omega^2_{S/R} \xrightarrow{d} \cdots$$

which is, termwise, the global sections of the sheaves $\Omega^r_{X/Y}$.

To take a very particular example, suppose that $X=\operatorname{Spec}\Q \left [x,x^{-1} \right ]$ is the multiplicative group over $\Q.$ Because this is an affine scheme, hypercohomology reduces to ordinary cohomology. The algebraic de Rham complex is

$$\Q[x, x^{-1}] \xrightarrow{d} \Q[x, x^{-1}]\,dx.$$

The differential d obeys the usual rules of calculus, meaning $d(x^n) = nx^{n-1}\,dx.$ The kernel and cokernel compute algebraic de Rham cohomology, so

$$\begin{align}
H_\text{dR}^0(X) &= \Q  \\
H_\text{dR}^1(X) &= \Q \cdot x^{-1} dx
\end{align}$$

and all other algebraic de Rham cohomology groups are zero. By way of comparison, the algebraic de Rham cohomology groups of $Y=\operatorname{Spec}\mathbb{F}_p \left [x,x^{-1} \right ]$ are much larger, namely,

$$\begin{align}
H_\text{dR}^0(Y) &= \bigoplus_{k \in \Z} \mathbb{F}_p \cdot x^{kp} \\
H_\text{dR}^1(Y) &= \bigoplus_{k \in \Z} \mathbb{F}_p \cdot x^{kp-1}\,dx
\end{align}$$

Since the Betti numbers of these cohomology groups are not what is expected, crystalline cohomology was developed to remedy this issue; it defines a Weil cohomology theory over finite fields.

=== Grothendieck's comparison theorem ===
If X is a smooth complex algebraic variety, there is a natural comparison map of complexes of sheaves

$$\Omega^{\bullet}_{X/\Complex}(-) \to \Omega^{\bullet}_{X^\text{an}}((-)^\text{an})$$

between the algebraic de Rham complex and the smooth de Rham complex defined in terms of (complex-valued) differential forms on $X^\text{an}$, the complex manifold associated to X. Here, $(-)^{\text{an}}$ denotes the complex analytification functor. This map is far from being an isomorphism. Nonetheless, Grothendieck (1966a) showed that the comparison map induces an isomorphism

$$H^\ast_\text{dR}(X/\Complex) \cong H^\ast_\text{dR}(X^\text{an})$$

from algebraic to smooth de Rham cohomology (and thus to singular cohomology $H^*_{\text{sing}}(X^{\text{an}}; \C)$ by de Rham's theorem). In particular, if X is a smooth affine algebraic variety embedded in $\C^n$, then the inclusion of the subcomplex of algebraic differential forms into that of all smooth forms on X is a quasi-isomorphism. For example, if

$$X = \{ (w,z) \in \C^2: w z =1 \}$$,

then as shown above, the computation of algebraic de Rham cohomology gives explicit generators $\{ 1, z^{-1} dz \}$ for $H^0_{\text{dR}}(X/\C)$ and $H^1_{\text{dR}}(X/ \C)$, respectively, while all other cohomology groups vanish. Since X is homotopy equivalent to a circle, this is as predicted by Grothendieck's theorem.

Counter-examples in the singular case can be found with non-Du Bois singularities such as the graded ring $k[x,y]/(y^2-x^3)$ with $y$ where $\deg(y)=3$ and $\deg(x)=2$. Other counterexamples can be found in algebraic plane curves with isolated singularities whose Milnor and Tjurina numbers are non-equal.

A proof of Grothendieck's theorem using the concept of a mixed Weil cohomology theory was given by Cisinski & Déglise (2013).

== Applications ==
=== Canonical divisor ===
If X is a smooth variety over a field k, then $\Omega_{X/k}$ is a vector bundle (i.e., a locally free $\mathcal O_X$-module) of rank equal to the dimension of X. This implies, in particular, that

$$\omega_{X/k} := \bigwedge^{\dim X} \Omega_{X/k}$$

is a line bundle or, equivalently, a divisor. It is referred to as the canonical divisor. The canonical divisor is, as it turns out, a dualizing complex and therefore appears in various important theorems in algebraic geometry such as Serre duality or Verdier duality.

=== Classification of algebraic curves ===
The geometric genus of a smooth algebraic variety X of dimension d over a field k is defined as the dimension

$$g := \dim H^0(X, \Omega^d_{X/k}).$$

For curves, this purely algebraic definition agrees with the topological definition (for $k=\Complex$) as the "number of handles" of the Riemann surface associated to X. There is a rather sharp trichotomy of geometric and arithmetic properties depending on the genus of a curve, for g being 0 (rational curves), 1 (elliptic curves), and greater than 1 (hyperbolic Riemann surfaces, including hyperelliptic curves), respectively.

=== Tangent bundle and Riemann–Roch theorem ===
The tangent bundle of a smooth variety X is, by definition, the dual of the cotangent sheaf $\Omega_{X/k}$. The Riemann–Roch theorem and its far-reaching generalization, the Grothendieck–Riemann–Roch theorem, contain as a crucial ingredient the Todd class of the tangent bundle.

=== Unramified and smooth morphisms ===
The sheaf of differentials is related to various algebro-geometric notions. A morphism $f: X \to Y$ of schemes is unramified if and only if $\Omega_{X/Y}$ is zero. A special case of this assertion is that for a field k, $K := k[t]/f$ is separable over k iff $\Omega_{K/k} = 0$, which can also be read off the above computation.

A morphism f of finite type is a smooth morphism if it is flat and if $\Omega_{X/Y}$ is a locally free $\mathcal O_X$-module of appropriate rank. The computation of $\Omega_{R[t_1, \ldots, t_n]/R}$ above shows that the projection from affine space $\mathbb A^n_R \to \operatorname{Spec}(R)$ is smooth.

=== Periods ===
Periods are, broadly speaking, integrals of certain arithmetically defined differential forms. The simplest example of a period is $2 \pi i$, which arises as

$$\int_{S^1} \frac {dz} z = 2 \pi i.$$

Algebraic de Rham cohomology is used to construct periods as follows: For an algebraic variety X defined over $\Q,$ the above-mentioned compatibility with base-change yields a natural isomorphism

$$H^n_\text{dR}(X / \Q) \otimes_{\Q} \Complex = H^n_\text{dR}(X \otimes_{\Q} \Complex / \Complex).$$

On the other hand, the right hand cohomology group is isomorphic to de Rham cohomology of the complex manifold $X^\text{an}$ associated to X, denoted here $H^n_\text{dR}(X^\text{an}).$ Yet another classical result, de Rham's theorem, asserts an isomorphism of the latter cohomology group with singular cohomology (or sheaf cohomology) with complex coefficients, $H^n(X^\text{an}, \Complex)$, which by the universal coefficient theorem is in its turn isomorphic to $H^n(X^\text{an}, \Q) \otimes_{\Q} \Complex.$ Composing these isomorphisms yields two rational vector spaces which, after tensoring with $\Complex$ become isomorphic. Choosing bases of these rational subspaces (also called lattices), the determinant of the base-change matrix is a complex number, well defined up to multiplication by a rational number. Such numbers are periods.

=== Algebraic number theory ===
In algebraic number theory, Kähler differentials may be used to study the ramification in an extension of algebraic number fields. If L / K is a finite extension with rings of integers R and S respectively then the different ideal δ_{L / K}, which encodes the ramification data, is the annihilator of the R-module Ω_{R/S}:

$$\delta_{L/K} = \{ x \in R : x \,dy = 0 \text{ for all } y \in R \}.$$

== Related notions ==
Hochschild homology is a homology theory for associative rings that turns out to be closely related to Kähler differentials. This is because of the Hochschild-Kostant-Rosenberg theorem which states that the Hochschild homology $HH_\bullet(R)$ of an algebra of a smooth variety is isomorphic to the de-Rham complex $\Omega^\bullet_{R/k}$ for $k$ a field of characteristic $0$. A derived enhancement of this theorem states that the Hochschild homology of a differential graded algebra is isomorphic to the derived de-Rham complex.

The de Rham–Witt complex is, in very rough terms, an enhancement of the de Rham complex for the ring of Witt vectors.
