= Different ideal =

In algebraic number theory, the different ideal (sometimes simply the different) is defined to measure the (possible) lack of duality in the ring of integers of an algebraic number field K, with respect to the field trace. It then encodes the ramification data for prime ideals of the ring of integers. It was introduced by Richard Dedekind in 1882.

== Definition ==
If O_{K} is the ring of integers of K, and tr denotes the field trace from K to the rational number field Q, then

$$x \mapsto \mathrm{tr}~x^2$$

is an integral quadratic form on O_{K}. Its discriminant as quadratic form need not be +1 (in fact this happens only for the case K = Q). Define the inverse different or codifferent or Dedekind's complementary module as the set I of x ∈ K such that tr(xy) is an integer for all y in O_{K}, then I is a fractional ideal of K containing O_{K}. By definition, the different ideal δ_{K} is the inverse fractional ideal I^{−1}: it is an ideal of O_{K}.

The ideal norm of δ_{K} is equal to the ideal of Z generated by the field discriminant D_{K} of K.

The different of an element α of K with minimal polynomial f is defined to be δ(α) = f′(α) if α generates the field K (and zero otherwise): we may write

$$\delta(\alpha) = \prod \left({\alpha - \alpha^{(i)}}\right) \$$

where the α^{(i)} run over all the roots of the characteristic polynomial of α other than α itself. The different ideal is generated by the differents of all integers α in O_{K}. This is Dedekind's original definition.

The different is also defined for a finite degree extension of local fields. It plays a basic role in Pontryagin duality for p-adic fields.

== Relative different ==
The relative different δ_{L / K} is defined in a similar manner for an extension of number fields L / K. The relative norm of the relative different is then equal to the relative discriminant Δ_{L / K}. In a tower of fields L / K / F the relative differents are related by δ_{L / F} = δ_{L / K}δ_{K / F}.

The relative different equals the annihilator of the relative Kähler differential module $\Omega^1_{O_L/O_K}$:

$$\delta_{L/K} = \{ x \in O_L : x \mathrm{d} y = 0 \text{ for all } y \in O_L \} .$$

The ideal class of the relative different δ_{L / K} is always a square in the class group of O_{L}, the ring of integers of L. Since the relative discriminant is the norm of the relative different it is the square of a class in the class group of O_{K}: indeed, it is the square of the Steinitz class for O_{L} as a O_{K}-module.

== Ramification ==
The relative different encodes the ramification data of the field extension L / K. A prime ideal p of K ramifies in L if the factorisation of p in L contains a prime of L to a power higher than 1: this occurs if and only if p divides the relative discriminant Δ_{L / K}. More precisely, if

p = P_{1}^{e(1)} ... P_{k}^{e(k)}

is the factorisation of p into prime ideals of L then P_{i} divides the relative different δ_{L / K} if and only if P_{i} is ramified, that is, if and only if the ramification index e(i) is greater than 1. The precise exponent to which a ramified prime P divides δ is termed the differential exponent of P and is equal to e − 1 if P is tamely ramified: that is, when P does not divide e. In the case when P is wildly ramified the differential exponent lies in the range e to e + eν_{P}(e) − 1. The differential exponent can be computed from the orders of the higher ramification groups for Galois extensions: $\sum_{i=0}^\infty (|G_i|-1).$

== Local computation ==
The different may be defined for an extension of local fields L / K. In this case we may take the extension to be simple, generated by a primitive element α which also generates a power integral basis. If f is the minimal polynomial for α then the different is generated by f'(α).
