= Turkish Mathematical Society =

Turkish association

- Türk Matematik Derneği
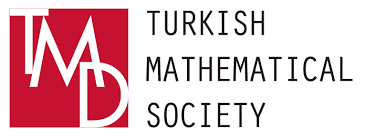
- Formation: 1948
- Headquarters: Istanbul, Turkey
- Location: Turkey
- Official language: Turkish
- President: Özlem Beyarslan
- Website: tmd.org.tr

The Turkish Mathematical Society (Turkish: Türk Matematik Derneği, TMD) is a Turkish organization dedicated to the development of mathematics in Turkey. Its members are individual mathematicians living in Turkey or Turkish mathematicians living abroad.

== Goals ==
The Society seeks to serve mathematicians particularly in universities, research institutes and other forms of higher education. Its aims are to

1. Promote mathematical research in Turkey,
2. Concern itself with the broader relations of mathematics to society,
3. Assist and advise on problems of mathematical education,
4. Try to establish solidarity among mathematicians,
5. Cooperate with or join national and international institutions with common aims,
6. Raise public awareness of mathematics.

The TMD is a Member of the International Mathematical Union (IMU), the European Mathematical Society (EMS) and the Mathematical Society of South Eastern Europe (MASSEE). In 2012, the society published a report of education and research policy in Turkey in relation to mathematics, and has attempted to influence national policy since.

== History ==
The Turkish Mathematical Society was founded in 1948, by eminent researchers of the Istanbul University and Istanbul Technical University, including Cahit Arf, Mustafa İnan, and Nazım Terzioğlu. It became a full member of IMU in 1960 and was raised to Group II in 2016. TMD became a member of the EMS in 2008 and of the MASSEE in 2014. The Society is located in Istanbul and has had a branch in Ankara since 1992. An annual symposium has been organized every year for the last 30 years. A popular quarterly mathematics magazine, Matematik Dünyası, has been published since 1991.

=== Presidents ===
- Until 1976: Nazim Terzioglu
- 1976–1982: Cahit Arf
- 1982–1986: Fikret Kortel
- 1986–1989: Cahit Arf
- 1989–2008: Tosun Terzioğlu
- 2008–2010: Ali Ülger
- 2010–2016: Betül Tanbay
- 2016–2018: Attila Aşkar
- 2018–2020: Burak Özbağcı
- 2020–2023: Ergün Yalçın
- 2024–present: Özlem Beyarslan

== Structure and governance ==
The governing body of the TMD is its General Assembly, consisting of all full members. The General Assembly meets every two years, and appoints the Executive Committee members who are responsible for the running of the society.

== See also ==
- List of mathematical societies
