= Hasse's theorem =

In mathematics, there are several theorems of Helmut Hasse that are sometimes called Hasse's theorem:

- Hasse norm theorem
- Hasse's theorem on elliptic curves
- Hasse–Arf theorem
- Hasse–Minkowski theorem

== See also ==
- Hasse principle, the principle that an integer equation can be solved by piecing together modular solutions
