= Ramification group =

Filtration of the Galois group of a local field extension

In number theory, more specifically in local class field theory, the ramification groups are a filtration of the Galois group of a local field extension, which gives detailed information on the ramification phenomena of the extension.

== Ramification theory of valuations ==
In mathematics, the ramification theory of valuations studies the set of extensions of a valuation v of a field K to an extension L of K. It is a generalization of the ramification theory of Dedekind domains.

The structure of the set of extensions is known better when L/K is Galois.

=== Decomposition group and inertia group ===
Let (K, v) be a valued field and let L be a finite Galois extension of K. Let S_{v} be the set of equivalence classes of extensions of v to L and let G be the Galois group of L over K. Then G acts on S_{v} by σ[w] = [w ∘ σ] (i.e. w is a representative of the equivalence class [w] ∈ S_{v} and [w] is sent to the equivalence class of the composition of w with the automorphism σ : L → L; this is independent of the choice of w in [w]). In fact, this action is transitive.

Given a fixed extension w of v to L, the decomposition group of w is the stabilizer subgroup G_{w} of [w], i.e. it is the subgroup of G consisting of all elements that fix the equivalence class [w] ∈ S_{v}.

Let m_{w} denote the maximal ideal of w inside the valuation ring R_{w} of w. The inertia group of w is the subgroup I_{w} of G_{w} consisting of elements σ such that σx ≡ x (mod m_{w}) for all x in R_{w}. In other words, I_{w} consists of the elements of the decomposition group that act trivially on the residue field of w. It is a normal subgroup of G_{w}.

The reduced ramification index e(w/v) is independent of w and is denoted e(v). Similarly, the relative degree f(w/v) is also independent of w and is denoted f(v).

== Ramification groups in lower numbering ==
Ramification groups are a refinement of the Galois group $G$ of a finite $L/K$ Galois extension of local fields. We shall write $w, \mathcal O_L, \mathfrak p$ for the valuation, the ring of integers and its maximal ideal for $L$. As a consequence of Hensel's lemma, one can write $\mathcal O_L = \mathcal O_K[\alpha]$ for some $\alpha \in L$ where $\mathcal O_K$ is the ring of integers of $K$. (This is stronger than the primitive element theorem.) Then, for each integer $i \ge -1$, we define $G_i$ to be the set of all $s \in G$ that satisfies the following equivalent conditions.

- (i) $s$ operates trivially on $\mathcal O_L / \mathfrak p^{i+1}.$
- (ii) $w(s(x) - x) \ge i+1$ for all $x \in \mathcal O_L$
- (iii) $w(s(\alpha) - \alpha) \ge i+1.$

The group $G_i$ is called $i$-th ramification group. They form a decreasing filtration,

$$G_{-1} = G \supset G_0 \supset G_1 \supset \dots \{*\}.$$

In fact, the $G_i$ are normal by (i) and trivial for sufficiently large $i$ by (iii). For the lowest indices, it is customary to call $G_0$ the inertia subgroup of $G$ because of its relation to splitting of prime ideals, while $G_1$ the wild inertia subgroup of $G$. The quotient $G_0 / G_1$ is called the tame quotient.

The Galois group $G$ and its subgroups $G_i$ are studied by employing the above filtration or, more specifically, the corresponding quotients. In particular,

- $G/G_0 = \operatorname{Gal}(l/k),$ where $l, k$ are the (finite) residue fields of $L, K$.
- $G_0 = 1 \Leftrightarrow L/K$ is unramified.
- $G_1 = 1 \Leftrightarrow L/K$ is tamely ramified (i.e., the ramification index is prime to the residue characteristic.)

The study of ramification groups reduces to the totally ramified case since one has $G_i = (G_0)_i$ for $i \ge 0$.

One also defines the function $i_G(s) = w(s(\alpha) - \alpha), s \in G$. (ii) in the above shows $i_G$ is independent of choice of $\alpha$ and, moreover, the study of the filtration $G_i$ is essentially equivalent to that of $i_G$. $i_G$ satisfies the following: for $s, t \in G$,

- $i_G(s) \ge i + 1 \Leftrightarrow s \in G_i.$
- $i_G(t s t^{-1}) = i_G(s).$
- $i_G(st) \ge \min\{ i_G(s), i_G(t) \}.$

Fix a uniformizer $\pi$ of $L$. Then $s \mapsto s(\pi)/\pi$ induces the injection $G_i/G_{i+1} \to U_{L, i}/U_{L, i+1}, i \ge 0$ where $U_{L, 0} = \mathcal{O}_L^\times, U_{L, i} = 1 + \mathfrak{p}^i$. (The map actually does not depend on the choice of the uniformizer.) It follows from this

- $G_0/G_1$ is cyclic of order prime to $p$
- $G_i/G_{i+1}$ is a product of cyclic groups of order $p$.

In particular, $G_1$ is a p-group and $G_0$ is solvable.

The ramification groups can be used to compute the different $\mathfrak{D}_{L/K}$ of the extension $L/K$ and that of subextensions:

$$w(\mathfrak{D}_{L/K}) = \sum_{s \ne 1} i_G(s) = \sum_{i=0}^\infty (|G_i| - 1).$$

If $H$ is a normal subgroup of $G$, then, for $\sigma \in G$, $i_{G/H}(\sigma) = {1 \over e_{L/K}} \sum_{s \mapsto \sigma} i_G(s)$.

Combining this with the above one obtains: for a subextension $F/K$ corresponding to $H$,

$$v_F(\mathfrak{D}_{F/K}) = {1 \over e_{L/F}} \sum_{s \not\in H} i_G(s).$$

If $s \in G_i, t \in G_j, i, j \ge 1$, then $sts^{-1}t^{-1} \in G_{i+j+1}$. In the terminology of Lazard, this can be understood to mean the Lie algebra $\operatorname{gr}(G_1) = \sum_{i \ge 1} G_i/G_{i+1}$ is abelian.

=== Example: the cyclotomic extension ===
The ramification groups for a cyclotomic extension $K_n := \mathbf Q_p(\zeta)/\mathbf Q_p$, where $\zeta$ is a $p^n$-th primitive root of unity, can be described explicitly:

$$G_s = \operatorname{Gal}(K_n / K_e),$$

where e is chosen such that $p^{e-1} \le s < p^e$.

=== Example: a quartic extension ===
Let K be the extension of Q_{2} generated by $x_1=\sqrt{2+\sqrt{2}}$. The conjugates of $x_1$ are $x_2 = \sqrt{2-\sqrt{2}}$, $x_3 = -x_1$, $x_4 = -x_2$.

A little computation shows that the quotient of any two of these is a unit. Hence they all generate the same ideal; call it π. $\sqrt{2}$ generates π^{2}; (2)=π^{4}.

Now $x_1-x_3=2x_1$, which is in π^{5}.

and $x_1 - x_2 = \sqrt{4-2\sqrt{2}},$ which is in π^{3}.

Various methods show that the Galois group of K is $C_4$, cyclic of order 4. Also:

$$G_0 = G_1 = G_2 = C_4.$$

and $G_3 = G_4=(13)(24).$

$w(\mathfrak{D}_{K/Q_2}) = 3+3+3+1+1 = 11,$ so that the different $\mathfrak{D}_{K/Q_2} = \pi^{11}$

$x_1$ satisfies X^{4} − 4X^{2} + 2, which has discriminant 2048 = 2^{11}.

== Ramification groups in upper numbering ==
If $u$ is a real number $\ge -1$, let $G_u$ denote $G_i$ where i the least integer $\ge u$. In other words, $s \in G_u \Leftrightarrow i_G(s) \ge u+1.$ Define $\phi$ by

$$\phi(u) = \int_0^u {dt \over (G_0 : G_t)}$$

where, by convention, $(G_0 : G_t)$ is equal to $(G_{-1} : G_0)^{-1}$ if $t = -1$ and is equal to $1$ for $-1 < t \le 0$. Then $\phi(u) = u$ for $-1 \le u \le 0$. It is immediate that $\phi$ is continuous and strictly increasing, and thus has the continuous inverse function $\psi$ defined on $[-1, \infty)$. Define $G^v = G_{\psi(v)}$. $G^v$ is then called the v-th ramification group in upper numbering. In other words, $G^{\phi(u)} = G_u$. Note $G^{-1} = G, G^0 = G_0$. The upper numbering is defined so as to be compatible with passage to quotients: if $H$ is normal in $G$, then

$(G/H)^v = G^v H / H$ for all $v$

(whereas lower numbering is compatible with passage to subgroups.)

=== Herbrand's theorem ===
Herbrand's theorem states that the ramification groups in the lower numbering satisfy $G_u H/H = (G/H)_v$ (for $v = \phi_{L/F}(u)$ where $L/F$ is the subextension corresponding to $H$), and that the ramification groups in the upper numbering satisfy $G^u H/H = (G/H)^u$. This allows one to define ramification groups in the upper numbering for infinite Galois extensions (such as the absolute Galois group of a local field) from the inverse system of ramification groups for finite subextensions.

The upper numbering for an abelian extension is important because of the Hasse–Arf theorem. It states that if $G$ is abelian, then the jumps in the filtration $G^v$ are integers; i.e., $G_i = G_{i+1}$ whenever $\phi(i)$ is not an integer.

The upper numbering is compatible with the filtration of the norm residue group by the unit groups under the Artin isomorphism. The image of $G^n(L/K)$ under the isomorphism

$$G(L/K)^{\mathrm{ab}} \leftrightarrow K^*/N_{L/K}(L^*)$$

is just

$$U^n_K / (U^n_K \cap N_{L/K}(L^*)) \ .$$

== See also ==
- Finite extensions of local fields
