= Arf semigroup =

In mathematics, Arf semigroups are certain subsets of the non-negative integers closed under addition, that were studied by Cahit Arf (1948). They appeared as the semigroups of values of Arf rings.

A subset of the integers forms a monoid if it includes zero, and if every two elements in the subset have a sum that also belongs to the subset. In this case, it is called a "numerical semigroup". A numerical semigroup is called an Arf semigroup if, for every three elements x, y, and z with z = min(x, y, and z), the semigroup also contains the element x + y − z.

For instance, the set containing zero and all even numbers greater than 10 is an Arf semigroup.
