= De-sparsified lasso =

Generalized linear model

De-sparsified lasso contributes to construct confidence intervals and statistical tests for single or low-dimensional components of a large parameter vector in high-dimensional model.

== High-dimensional linear model ==
$Y = X\beta^0 + \epsilon$ with $n \times p$ design matrix $X =: [X_1,..., X_p]$ ($n \times p$ vectors $X_j$), $\epsilon \sim N_n(0, \sigma^2_\epsilon I)$ independent of $X$ and unknown regression $p \times 1$ vector $\beta^0$.

The usual method to find the parameter is by Lasso: $\hat{\beta}^n(\lambda) = \underset{\beta \in \mathbb{R} ^ p}{\arg\min} \ \frac{1}{2 n} \left\| Y - X \beta \right\| ^ 2 _ 2 + \lambda \left\| \beta \right\| _ 1.$

The de-sparsified lasso is a method modified from the Lasso estimator which fulfills the Karush–Kuhn–Tucker conditions is as follows:

$\hat{\beta}^n(\lambda,M) = \hat{\beta}^n(\lambda) + \frac{1}{n} M X^T(Y- X \hat{\beta}^n (\lambda))$

where $M \in \mathbb{R}^{p\times p}$ is an arbitrary matrix. The matrix $M$ is generated using a surrogate inverse covariance matrix.

== Generalized linear model ==
Desparsifying $l_1$-norm penalized estimators and corresponding theory can also be applied to models with convex loss functions such as generalized linear models.

Consider the following $1 \times p$ vectors of covariables $x_i \in \chi\subset \mathbb{R}^p$ and univariate responses $y_i \in Y \subset R$ for $i = 1,...,n$

we have a loss function $\rho_\beta(y,x) = \rho(y, x \beta) (\beta \in \mathbb{R}^p)$ which is assumed to be strictly convex function in $\beta \in \mathbb{R}^p.$

The $l_1$-norm regularized estimator is $\hat{\beta}=\underset{\beta}{\arg\min}(P_n \rho_\beta + \lambda\left\| \beta \right\|_1).$

Similarly, the Lasso for node wise regression with matrix input is defined as follows: Denote by $\hat{\Sigma}$ a matrix which we want to approximately invert using nodewise lasso.

The de-sparsified $l_1$-norm regularized estimator is as follows: $\hat{\gamma_j}:= \underset{\gamma \in \mathbb{R}^{p-1}}{\arg\min}(\hat{\Sigma}_{j,j} - 2 \hat{\Sigma}_{j,/j} \gamma + \gamma^T \hat{\Sigma}_{/j,/j} \gamma + 2 \lambda_j\left\|\gamma\right\|_1$

where $\hat{\Sigma}_{j,/j}$ denotes the $j$th row of $\hat{\Sigma}$ without the diagonal element $(j,j)$, and $\hat{\Sigma}_{/j,/j}$ is the sub matrix without the $j$th row and $j$th column.
