= Nüzhet Gökdoğan =

Turkish astronomer and mathematician (1910–2003)

- Born: 14 August 1910; Constantinople, Ottoman Empire (modern Istanbul, Turkey)
- Died: 24 April 2003 (aged 92)
- Education: University of Lyon (BSc); Istanbul University (PhD)
- Occupations: Astronomer; academic
- Spouse: Mukbil Gökdoğan (died 1992)
- Children: 2

Hatice Nüzhet Gökdoğan (Turkish: [haˈtidʒe ˈnyzhet ˈɟœkdoan]; 14 August 1910 – 24 April 2003) was a Turkish astronomer, mathematician and academic. After studying mathematics and astronomy in France as a young adult, Gökdoğan joined the faculty of Istanbul University in 1934 and completed her PhD. She was elected Dean of the university's Faculty of Science in 1954, becoming the first Turkish woman to serve as a university dean, and she was later made Chair of the astronomy department, significantly expanding her department's capacity and working to improve national and international collaboration between astronomers.

Gökdoğan co-founded the Turkish Mathematical Society, the Turkish Astronomy Association and the Turkish University Women's Association. She was Turkey's first national representative at the International Astronomical Union (IAU), and has been credited as Turkey's first female astronomer.

== Early life and education ==
Nüzhet Gökdoğan was born on 14 August 1910 in Istanbul (then Constantinople). Her mother was named Nebihe Hanım, while her father was Mehmet Zihni Toydemir, a major general.

In her late teens, Gökdoğan received a scholarship to study in France; she enrolled in the University of Lyon and in 1932 she completed her undergraduate degree in mathematics. She had a strong interest in astronomy and subsequently studied physics at the University of Paris, where she received a Diplome d'Etudes Superieures. She then completed an internship at the Paris Observatory.

== Career ==
Returning to Turkey in 1934, Gökdoğan applied to work at the Kandilli Observatory, but was turned down because the director did not want a woman working there. She instead joined Istanbul University as a faculty member in the Astronomy Department. She was the first woman member of the school's faculty of science. She completed her PhD three years later, submitting a dissertation entitled Contribution aux recherches sur l'existence d'une matière obscure interstellaire homogène autour du soleil (Contribution to research on the existence of homogeneous interstellar dark matter around the sun). Gökdoğan's dissertation was recorded as the first doctoral thesis completed at Istanbul University's faculty of science.

In 1948, Gökdoğan was made full professor at the university, and also co-founded the Turkish Mathematical Society. She served as president of the Turkish Union of Soroptimists in the early 1950s. Upon being elected Dean of Istanbul University's science faculty in 1954, Gökdoğan became the first Turkish woman to serve as a university dean. She was a founding member of the Turkish Astronomy Association that same year, and she served as president of the association for the next two decades. In 1958, she was appointed Chair of the Astronomy Department at Istanbul University, and she held the role for the rest of her time as a faculty member. Gökdoğan worked hard to expand her department, gradually increasing the number of staff from 5 to 18, and she developed a number of new collaborative programs with observatories in France, Italy and Switzerland. She wrote introductory textbooks on astronomy and spectroscopy for students in Turkish high schools. She also co-founded the Turkish University Women's Association, and served as its president more than once.

Gökdoğan was a member of the International Astronomical Union (IAU), and in 1961 she became the first national representative of Turkey to the IAU. In August 1961, she represented Turkey as a delegate at an IAU conference in Berkeley, California. During her time as a member in the IAU, she participated in two of its commissions on "theory of stellar atmospheres" and "solar radiation and structure".

She organized a number of national and international astronomy symposiums in Turkey. One of these events in the late 1970s was credited with solidifying broader interest in building a new national observatory.

Gökdoğan retired from Istanbul University in 1980.

== Personal life ==
Gökdoğan married Mukbil Gökdoğan, who was an architecture professor and former minister of public works. They had two children, both of whom grew up to become university professors. Mukbil died in 1992.

Gökdoğan died on 24 April 2003.

=== Legacy ===
A Google Doodle was published on 14 August 2023 celebrating the 113th birthday of Gökdoğan.
