= Norm form =

In mathematics, a norm form is a homogeneous form in n variables constructed from the field norm of a field extension L/K of degree n. That is, writing N for the norm mapping to K, and selecting a basis e_{1}, ..., e_{n} for L as a vector space over K, the form is given by

N(x_{1}e_{1} + ... + x_{n}e_{n})

in variables x_{1}, ..., x_{n}.

In number theory norm forms are studied as Diophantine equations, where they generalize, for example, the Pell equation. For this application the field K is usually the rational number field, the field L is an algebraic number field, and the basis is taken of some order in the ring of integers O_{L} of L.

== See also ==
- Trace form
