= Nazım Terzioğlu =

Turkish mathematician (1912-1976)

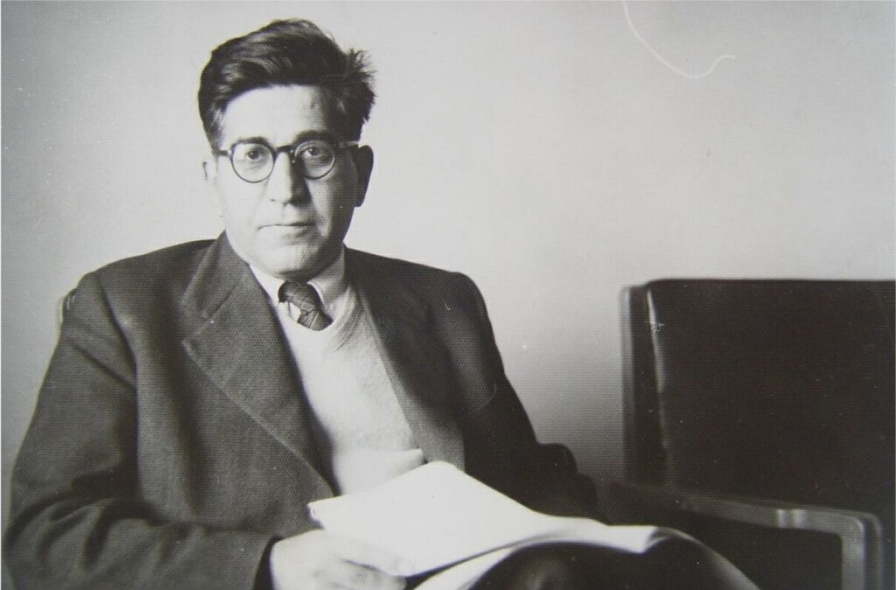
- Born: 1912; Kayseri, Ottoman Empire
- Died: September 20, 1976 (aged 63–64); Silivri, Istanbul, Turkey
- Education: University of Göttingen; Ludwig-Maximilians-Universität München
- Spouse: Meliha Terzioğlu
- Children: Tosun Terzioğlu
- Scientific career
- Fields: Mathematics
- Workplaces: Istanbul University
- Doctoral advisor: Constantin Carathéodory; Rolf Herman Nevanlinna

Nazım Terzioğlu (1912 – September 20, 1976) was a Turkish mathematician. He was one of the first mathematicians in Turkish academia. His son, Tosun Terzioğlu, was also a mathematician.

== Early life ==
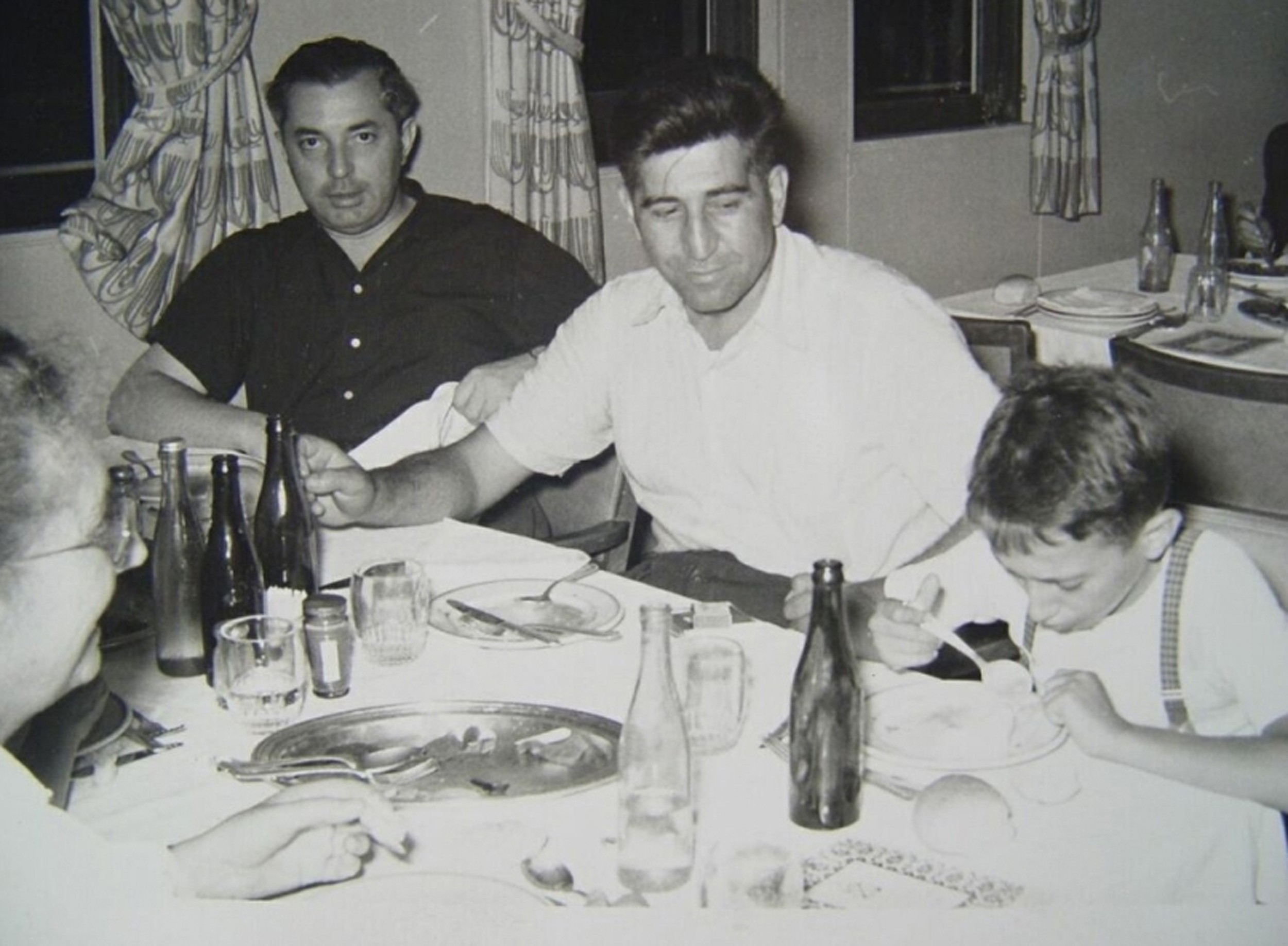
Nazım Terzioğlu

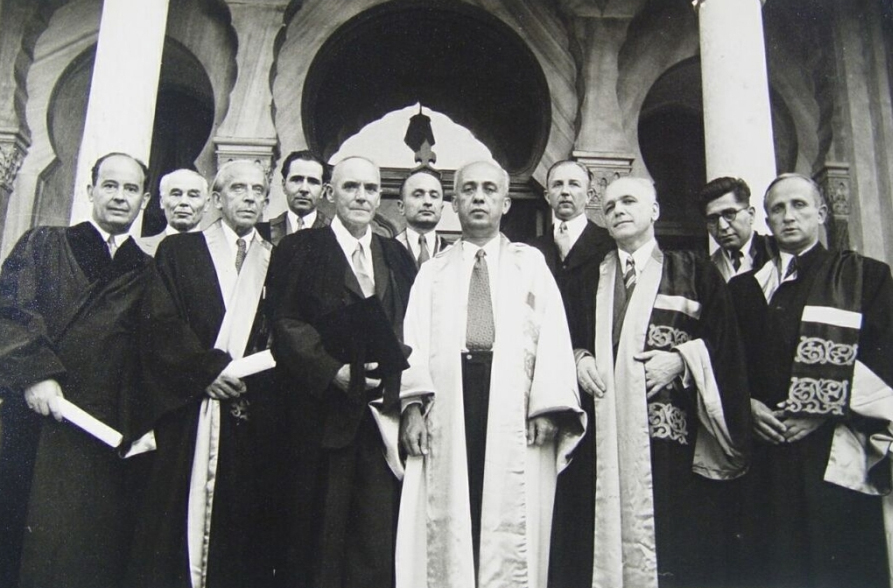
Nazım Terzioğlu with his colleagues, second from the left

Nazım Terzioğlu completed his primary education in his place of birth, Kayseri. He started his secondary education in Istanbul and then continued in İzmir until his graduation from İzmir High School in 1930. At that time, some of Turkey's most qualified mathematics teachers worked at İzmir High School. Alumni of that school included mathematicians such as Cahit Arf (1910–1997) and Tevfik Oktay Kabakcıoğlu (1910–1971).

In those years, the successful young people were sent abroad by the government to be trained as qualified workforce in various fields needed for the country. Terzioğlu passed the relevant exam and left for Germany to study mathematics on behalf of the Ministry of Education of Turkey. He pursued his higher education at the University of Göttingen and the Ludwig-Maximilians-Universität München.

He completed his Ph.D. under the supervision of the famous mathematician of that period, Constantin Carathéodory (1873–1950), who was a member of a Greek family in Fener, Istanbul.

== Career ==
Upon completion of his education in Germany, Terzioğlu began to work as an assistant of Mathematical Mechanics and Advanced Geometry in the Institute of Mathematics of the Faculty of Science of Istanbul University in 1937. He became associate professor in 1942 and the following year, he was appointed to professorship in the newly established Institute of Mathematics of the Faculty of Science of Ankara University (1943). After spending two years in this faculty, he returned to Istanbul University as a professor (1944).

At Istanbul University, he worked as the Dean of the Faculty of Science in 1950–1952. During the same period, Terzioğlu established some of the scientific institutions for which Turkey had felt the major need until those years. These are the Institute for Geophysics of Istanbul University, the Institute for Hydrobiology in Istanbul Baltalimanı and the Cosmic Ray Institute which Terzioğlu founded at Uludağ, Bursa in cooperation with Adnan Sokullu and Sait Akpınar. After his deanship in the Faculty of Science, he became the Chairman of the Analysis Division of the Institute of Mathematics in the same faculty (1953).

In 1965–1967, Terzioğlu, in addition to his responsibilities in Istanbul University, worked first by proxy then acting as the principal founder-rector of Karadeniz Technical University (KTU). It is his honour to establish the first Faculty of Fundamental Sciences of Turkey in KTU. In 1967, Terzioğlu returned to his mission in the Faculty of Science of Istanbul University. In 1969 and 1971, he was elected as the rector of Istanbul University. He had maintained this position for two periods (28 October 1969 – 28 October 1971 and 28 October 1971 – 31 May 1974). In his first years as a rector, he restored the building of a historical soup kitchen which was assigned by Wakfs to the university as a part of the Sehzade Mosque. On 6 August 1971, by setting up a new printing system in it, he put the same building into service with the name of Research Institute for Mathematics of Faculty of Science. Terzioğlu also established a mathematics library within this institute with a capacity of 2000 books which he provided through donations and purchase from foreign countries. After his death, the institute was named on the proposal of the Faculty of Science as Nazim Terzioğlu Mathematics Research Institute.

As an outcome of the negotiations with Silivri Municipality, Terzioğlu provided Istanbul University with 35 acres of land to be donated in Silivri. In a part of this land, 18 study rooms, 3 large conference halls, a library and a guest house to accommodate scientists coming from abroad were constructed in accord with his order. Terzioğlu considered graduate education very seriously. He believed that talented young people ought to be trained in a particular way. To provide such an environment, he invited foreign scientists and organized congresses, seminars, colloquia, summer and progress courses in Silivri facilities which was opened into use on September 3, 1973. Thanks to these activities, he made significant contributions to the education of young generations. The scientific meetings organized by Terzioğlu in Silivri facilities are:

- February 10–14, 1973: First National Meeting of Mathematicians;
- July 9–14, 1973: the preparatory course related to the Summer Seminar on International Display Theory of Finite Groups;
- July 15–28, 1973: Summer Seminar on International Display Theory of Finite Groups;
- August 20 – September 9, 1973: International Symposium on Functional Analysis;
- September 8–21, 1975: the preparatory course related to the International Symposium on Algebraic Number Theory;
- September 22–27, 1975: International Symposium on Algebraic Number Theory;
- April 23–26, 1976: Second National Meeting of Mathematicians;
- August 1976: Ultrasound Congress (joint with physicists);
- September 5–11, 1976: International Congress of Functional Analysis;
- September 20–25, 1976: Rolf Nevanlinna International Symposium.

== Death ==
Terzioğlu died as a result of a heart attack in the morning of the opening day of the International Symposium organized to tribute Rolf Nevanlinna, who had been a teacher of Terzioğlu. Albeit his unexpected loss, the symposium was completed after some rearrangements were made in the program. The guest mathematicians also attended the funeral ceremony on September 22 and the symposium began on September 23. Terzioğlu was elected as the honorary guest of this symposium and the title doctoris honoris causa was awarded to Rolf Nevanlinna by Istanbul University.

== Legacy ==
One of the contributions of Terzioğlu as the director of the Mathematics Research Institute to Turkey's mathematical culture and the history of science was the systematic scan of the Islamic literature relevant to mathematics and the presentation of the information related to conic sections in ancient mathematics to the scientific community. As a result of these efforts, the facsimile of two ancient texts of mathematics originally written in Arabic were realized. The first one is the preface of Mecmuatu'r-risail, the Arabic translation by Beni Musa b. Sakir (died in 873) of Conica, which is the work of Apollonius of Perga (BC 262–190) on the conic sections. This preface, published with the title Das Vorwort des Astronomen Bani Musa b. Sakir, describes how the Apollonius' Conica was acquired by the Islamic world. After that, Terzioğlu published the facsimile of the copy of the lost 8th book of Apollonius' Conica which was rewritten by Ibnu'l-Heysem (965–1039) with the help from other sources. In the introduction part of this book with the title Das Achte Buch zu den Conica des Apollonios von Perge, the following information is provided in summary:

In ancient mathematics, the interest for conics starts with Menaechmus (BC IV. Century) and reaches the summit with Apollonius of Perga. Apollonius wrote his famous work Conica by processing previous information and adding up his own inventions. The first 7 volumes of this work consisting of 8 volumes in total are known whereas the 8th volume is missing. The Islamic and Western mathematicians working in this field took place in the reconstruction of the 8th volume. The most successful one of these works is that of Edmund Halley's (1656–1742) Apollonii Per-gaei conicorum (Oxoniae, 1710). The 8th book of Conica reconstructed by Ibn el-Heysem is the 4th manuscript with the name Makalatu'l-Hasan b.el-Hasan b.el Heysem fi el-kitabu'l-mahrutat in the Mecmu'atu'r-risail, which is recorded under no. 1796 in Manisa Library. The fact that Ibn el-Heysem completed this work nearly 700 years before Halley is interesting.

Within the framework of this program, Terzioğlu was preparing for publication the first 7 books of Conica, which were translated into Arabic in 415/1024 AD by Ibnu'l-Heysem who had also examined the previous translations of his time. Terzioğlu's death coincides with the time when the facsimile of the manuscript located at No. 2762 of Suleymaniye Library, Ayasofya had been completed. As the part of the book he wanted to include related to the history of conics remained incomplete, it was removed from press and was published later with the title Kitab al-Mahrutat Das Buch der Kegelschnitte des Apollonios von Perge by the Research Institute for Mathematics. It includes a part in which the description of the manuscript and the direct translation of its preface are given in Turkish and German.

One of the most important services of Terzioğlu to the Turkish history of science is to make translate into Turkish in Latin letters the published first two volumes and the third volume as a manuscript (see Istanbul University Library TY. 903, 904, 905 for copies of manuscripts) of Asar-i Bakiye} (Vol. I–II, Istanbul, 1329/1913) by Salih Zeki Bey (1863–1921) during his presidency of the Turkish Mathematics Association. His aim was to offer such an old source to the benefit of young generations.

=== Positions and awards ===
Terzioğlu, who had an important role in the revival of the Union of Balkan Mathematicians (French: Union Balkanique des Mathematiciens) which was founded before World War II, had been the president of that organization for two periods (1966–1971). He was also selected as the chairman of the IV. Congress of Balkan Mathematicians organized in Istanbul on August 29, 1972. Among his other international activities, the role he played in providing Turkey with the membership of the International Mathematical Union is an unforgettable service.

In 1973, Terzioğlu was selected as a member of Hahnemann Medical Society of America. In 1974, he has been awarded the Medal of Merit of Federal Republic of Germany by the German President on his endeavor for the development of Turkish–German relations. He also has two medals given by the Charles University in Prague and the Finland University of Jyväskylä.

Nazim Terzioğlu has been awarded on December 2, 1982 the TÜBİTAK Service Award thanks to his contributions to the development of mathematics in our country.

His family established a Mathematics Research Award on behalf of Terzioğlu who gave efforts during his life for the development of mathematics and the creation of a research potential. For the first time, this award had been given to three young mathematicians in a ceremony at the Faculty of Science of Istanbul University on September 20, 1981, which is the fifth year of his death. The second award in 1982 was given to a young mathematician in the opening ceremony of the International Symposium on Mathematics that was held on 14–24 September 1982 at the Karadeniz Technical University where Terzioğlu served as the founder-rector.

His son, Tosun Terzioğlu (1942–2016) was a Turkish mathematician and academic administrator.

== Books ==
The books written by Terzioğlu, who has many published articles in his own field, are:

- Über Finslersche Raume (Doktorarbeit), München, 1936 (On Finsler Spaces (Ph.D. Thesis), Munich, 1936.)
- Fonksiyonlar Teorisine Baslangic. Fonksiyonlar Teorisi. 2 Cilt. (Konrad Knopp'dan ceviri), Istanbul, 1938–1939. (Introduction to the Theory of Functions. Theory of Functions by Konrad Knopp, 2 Volumes (translated), Istanbul, 1938–1939.)
- Finsler Uzay\i nda Gauss–Bonnet Teoremi, Istanbul 1948. (Gauss–Bonnet theorem in Finsler Spaces, Istanbul 1948.)
- Lise Fen Kolu Icin Modern Geometri: Konikler, (Ahmet Nazmi Ilker ile), Istanbul, 1960. (Modern Geometry for the Science Sections of High Schools: Conics, (with Ahmet Nazmi Ilker), Istanbul, 1960.)
- Liseler Icin Cebir Temrinleri (P. Aubert ve G. Papelier'den ceviri), Istanbul, 1960. (Exercises in Algebra for High Schools by P. Aubert and G. Papelier (translated), Istanbul, 1960.)
- Diferansiyel ve Integral Hesap, (Edmund Landau'dan ceviri), Istanbul, 1961. (Differential and Integral Calculus by Edmund Landau (translated), Istanbul, 1961.)
- Lise Fen Kolu Icin Modern Geometri. Fasikül I-Kesenler; Fasikül II-Harmonik Bolme, Harmonik Demet, Daireye Göre Kuvvet; Fasikül III-Daireye Göre Kutup ve Kutup Dogrusu (G. Papelier'den ceviri), Istanbul, 1968. (Modern Geometry for the Science Sections of High Schools. Fascicle I: Secants; Fascicle II: Harmonic Division, Harmonic Pencil, Power with respect to the sphere; Fascicle III: Pole and polar line with respect to the sphere by G. Papelier (translated), Istanbul, 1968.)
- Analiz Problemleri, Istanbul, 1973. (Problems in Analysis, Istanbul, 1973.)
- Das Vorwort des Astronomen Bani Musa b. Sakir zu den Conica des Apollonios von Perge, Istanbul, 1974. (The foreword of the Astronomer Bani Musa b. Sakir to the Conics of Apollonius of Perga, Istanbul, 1974.)
- Das achte Buch zu den Conica des Apollonios von Perge re-konstruiert von Ibn al-Haysam, Istanbul, 1974. (The Eighth Book to the Conics of Apollonius of Perga Reconstructed by Ibn-Haysam, Istanbul, 1974.)
- Kitab al-Mahrutat. Das Buch der Kegelschnitte des Apollonios von Perge, Istanbul, 1981. (Kitab al-Mahrutat. The Book of Conic Sections of Apollonius of Perga, Istanbul, 1981.)
