= Betül Tanbay =

Turkish mathematician

Betül Tanbay (born 1960) is a Turkish mathematician, scientist and professor of mathematics at the Boğaziçi University in Istanbul, Turkey and the first woman president of the Turkish Mathematical Society between 2010 and 2016.

== Education ==
Betül Tanbay was born in Istanbul and raised in Ankara until 1977. She graduated from the Lycée Janson de Sailly, Paris, France in 1978. She received her Licence en Mathématiques from Université Louis Pasteur, Strasbourg in 1982, and her PhD in Mathematics under the supervision of Robert Solovay at the University of California, Berkeley in the United States in 1989.

== Academic career ==
She has been a full time member and chairwoman in the Department of Mathematics, at Boğaziçi University, Istanbul. She has been the Vice-Provost for Foreign Affairs and represented her university at the European University Association between 2004 and 2007. She is the founding codirector of the Istanbul Center for Mathematical Sciences (IMBM). She has been in the scientific boards of research institutes such as IMBM, Feza Gürsey Institute, Institut d'Etudes Avancées - Aix Marseille (IMéRA). She was the director of a leading doctoral network project of TÜBİTAK between 2008 and 2012. She has worked as an executive committee member, including presidency, at the Turkish Mathematical Society; as delegate, Ethics Committee member, Raising Awareness Committee member, Executive Committee member at the European Mathematical Society where she was elected vice-president for the 2019-2022 period; and as delegate, member of the Committee for Women in Mathematics at the International Mathematical Union (IMU). In 2025 she was appointed as the Chair of the Governing Board of the IMU-IDM (International Day of Mathematics).

=== Visiting positions ===
She has held visiting positions at UC Berkeley and UC Santa Barbara, Université de Bordeaux, Institut de Mathématiques de Jussieu, University of Kansas, Pennsylvania State University and joined the Kadison-Singer Conjecture Workshop at the American Institute of Mathematics.

== Research areas ==
Her research interests include operator algebras and set theory.

=== Representative scientific journal publications ===
- C. Akemann, J. Anderson, B. Tanbay, Weak Paveability And The Kadison-Singer Problem, Journal of Operator Theory, vol. 71, no. 1, pp. 295–300 (2014). arXiv:1203.2854
- B. Tanbay, A Letter on the Kadison-Singer problem, Revue Roumaine des Mathématiques Pures et Appliquées, vol. 59, no. 2, pp. 293–302 (2014). http://imar.ro/journals/Revue_Mathematique/pdfs/2014/2/10.pdf
- C. Akemann, J. Anderson, B. Tanbay, The Kadison-Singer problem for the direct sum of matrix algebras, Positivity, vol. 16, no. 1, pp 53–66 (2012). https://link.springer.com/content/pdf/10.1007%2Fs11117-010-0109-1.pdf
- C. Akemann, B. Tanbay, A. Ülger A Note On The Kadison-Singer Problem, Journal of Operator Theory, vol. 63, no. 2, 363–274 (2010). arXiv:0708.2366
