= Tsen rank =

In mathematics, the Tsen rank of a field describes conditions under which a system of polynomial equations must have a solution in the field. The concept is named for C. C. Tsen, who introduced their study in 1936.

We consider a system of m polynomial equations in n variables over a field F. Assume that the equations all have constant term zero, so that (0, 0, ... ,0) is a common solution. We say that F is a T_{i}-field if every such system, of degrees d_{1}, ..., d_{m} has a common non-zero solution whenever

$$n > d_1^i + \cdots + d_m^i. \,$$

The Tsen rank of F is the smallest i such that F is a T_{i}-field. We say that the Tsen rank of F is infinite if it is not a T_{i}-field for any i (for example, if it is formally real).

== Properties ==
- A field has Tsen rank zero if and only if it is algebraically closed.
- A finite field has Tsen rank 1: this is the Chevalley–Warning theorem.
- If F is algebraically closed then rational function field F(X) has Tsen rank 1.
- If F has Tsen rank i, then the rational function field F(X) has Tsen rank at most i + 1.
- If F has Tsen rank i, then an algebraic extension of F has Tsen rank at most i.
- If F has Tsen rank i, then an extension of F of transcendence degree k has Tsen rank at most i + k.
- There exist fields of Tsen rank i for every integer i ≥ 0.

== Norm form ==
We define a norm form of level i on a field F to be a homogeneous polynomial of degree d in n=d^{i} variables with only the trivial zero over F (we exclude the case n=d=1). The existence of a norm form on level i on F implies that F is of Tsen rank at least i − 1. If E is an extension of F of finite degree n > 1, then the field norm form for E/F is a norm form of level 1. If F admits a norm form of level i then the rational function field F(X) admits a norm form of level i + 1. This allows us to demonstrate the existence of fields of any given Tsen rank.

== Diophantine dimension ==
The Diophantine dimension of a field is the smallest natural number k, if it exists, such that the field of is class C_{k}: that is, such that any homogeneous polynomial of degree d in N variables has a non-trivial zero whenever N > d^{k}. Algebraically closed fields are of Diophantine dimension 0; quasi-algebraically closed fields of dimension 1.

Clearly if a field is T_{i} then it is C_{i}, and T_{0} and C_{0} are equivalent, each being equivalent to being algebraically closed. It is not known whether Tsen rank and Diophantine dimension are equal in general.

== See also ==
- Tsen's theorem
