= Unramified morphism =

In algebraic geometry, an unramified morphism is a morphism $f: X \to Y$ of schemes such that (a) it is locally of finite presentation and (b) for each $x \in X$ and $y = f(x)$, we have that

1. The residue field $k(x)$ is a separable algebraic extension of $k(y)$.
2. $f^{\#}(\mathfrak{m}_y) \mathcal{O}_{x, X} = \mathfrak{m}_x,$ where $f^{\#}: \mathcal{O}_{y, Y} \to \mathcal{O}_{x, X}$ and $\mathfrak{m}_y, \mathfrak{m}_x$ are maximal ideals of the local rings.

A flat unramified morphism is called an étale morphism. Less strongly, if $f$ satisfies the conditions when restricted to sufficiently small neighborhoods of $x$ and $y$, then $f$ is said to be unramified near $x$.

Some authors prefer to use weaker conditions, in which case they call a morphism satisfying the above a G-unramified morphism.

== Simple example ==
Let $A$ be a ring and B the ring obtained by adjoining an integral element to A; i.e., $B = A[t]/(F)$ for some monic polynomial F. Then $\operatorname{Spec}(B) \to \operatorname{Spec}(A)$ is unramified if and only if the polynomial F is separable (i.e., it and its derivative generate the unit ideal of $A[t]$).

== Curve case ==
Let $f: X \to Y$ be a finite morphism between smooth connected curves over an algebraically closed field, P a closed point of X and $Q = f(P)$. We then have the local ring homomorphism $f^{\#} : \mathcal{O}_Q \to \mathcal{O}_P$ where $(\mathcal{O}_Q, \mathfrak{m}_Q)$ and $(\mathcal{O}_P, \mathfrak{m}_P)$ are the local rings at Q and P of Y and X. Since $\mathcal{O}_P$ is a discrete valuation ring, there is a unique integer $e_P > 0$ such that $f^{\#} (\mathfrak{m}_Q) \mathcal{O}_P = {\mathfrak{m}_P}^{e_P}$. The integer $e_P$ is called the ramification index of $P$ over $Q$. Since $k(P) = k(Q)$ as the base field is algebraically closed, $f$ is unramified at $P$ (in fact, étale) if and only if $e_P = 1$. Otherwise, $f$ is said to be ramified at P and Q is called a branch point.

== Characterization ==
Given a morphism $f: X \to Y$ that is locally of finite presentation, the following are equivalent:

1. f is unramified.
2. The diagonal map $\delta_f: X \to X \times_Y X$ is an open immersion.
3. The relative cotangent sheaf $\Omega_{X/Y}$ is zero.

== See also ==
- Finite extensions of local fields
- Ramification (mathematics)
