= Tsen's theorem =

In mathematics, Tsen's theorem states that a function field K of an algebraic curve over an algebraically closed field is quasi-algebraically closed (i.e., C_{1}). This implies that the Brauer group of any such field vanishes, and more generally that all the Galois cohomology groups H^{i}(K, K^{*}) vanish for i ≥ 1. This result is used to calculate the étale cohomology groups of an algebraic curve.

The theorem was published by Chiungtze C. Tsen in 1933.

== See also ==
- Tsen rank
