= Arf ring =

1-dimensional ring with special properties

In mathematics, an Arf ring was defined by Lipman (1971) to be a 1-dimensional commutative semi-local Macaulay ring satisfying some extra conditions studied by Cahit Arf (1948).
