= Du Bois singularity =

In algebraic geometry, Du Bois singularities are singularities of complex varieties studied by Du Bois.

Schwede gave the following characterisation of Du Bois singularities. Suppose that $X$ is a reduced closed subscheme of a smooth scheme $Y$.

Take a log resolution $\pi: Z \to Y$ of $X$ in $Y$ that is an isomorphism outside $X$, and let $E$ be the reduced preimage of $X$ in $Z$. Then $X$ has Du Bois singularities if and only if the induced map $\mathcal{O}_X \to R\pi_{*}\mathcal{O}_E$ is a quasi-isomorphism.
