= Tsen Shui Fang =

Chinese nurse, witness of Nanking Massacre (1875–1969)

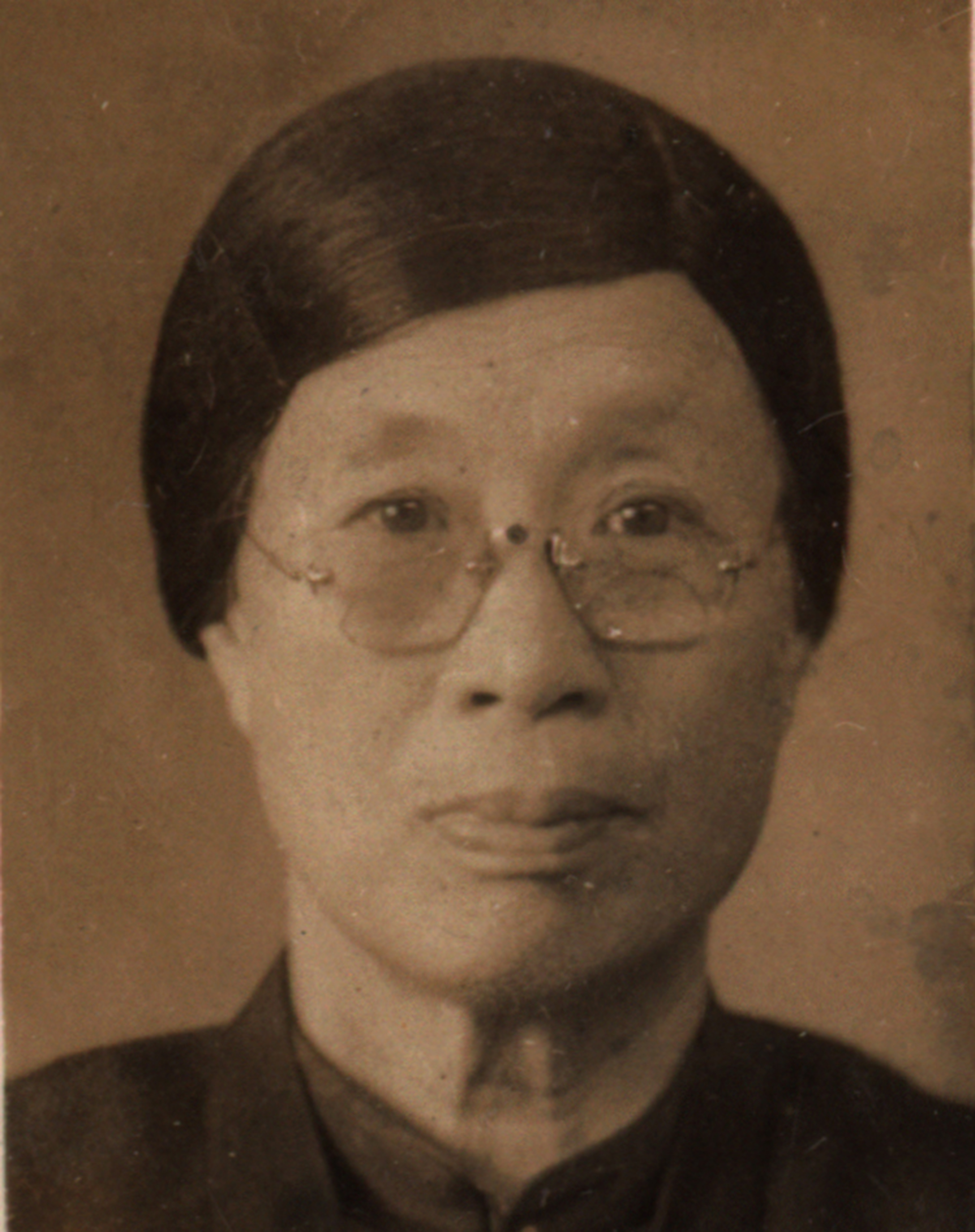
Tsen Shui Fang

Tsen Shui Fang (Chinese: 程瑞芳, 1875–1969), or Cheng Ruifang (née Yue) in some translations, was a Chinese nurse who worked in tandem with American missionary Wilhelmina "Minnie" Vautrin as her assistant during the Nanjing Massacre. Together Vautrin and Tsen would provide help for women and children in the Ginling College. Both Tsen and Vautrin kept diaries during their time in Nanjing, or Nanking, to document everyday occurrences they witnessed during the Japanese invasion. This diary has led her to be known as the "Anne Frank of the East," as this is the only firsthand account during Nanjing Massacre by a Chinese national. On October 10, 2015, Tsen's diary was added to the UNESCO Memory of the World Programme. The original scripts of the diary is currently kept in the Second Historical Archives of China in Nanjing.

In her early 60s, Tsen took on the role of director of dormitories at Ginling College, also known as the Jinling Women's College. Ginling College was a safety zone, established by Americans, and was used by Tsen and Vautrin among others as a site of rescue for women and children. Tsen moved back to her hometown Wuchang, Hubei after the war ended; however, there she lived in poverty. Dr. Wu Yi Fang, the president at Ginling College during the early 1900s, offered Tsen and her family financial aid.

During her lifetime, Tsen was married and had children. Tsen died in 1969 at the age of 94. Her grandson, Cheng Guoxiang, also lived through the experience with her at Ginling College and continues to retell her story.

== Early life ==
Born in 1875, Tsen Shui Fang originates from the district of Wuchang in Hubei's provincial capital of Wuhan. Her maiden name was Yue, adopting Tsen after marrying her husband. There is little documentation about her husband and children. Tsen graduated from Wuchang Nursing School and later held responsibilities as nurse and administrator of a local Wuchang Methodist Women's hospital. Here, she learned the necessary skills both as nurse and administrator that would later aid her contribution to the Emergency Committee. Very little else is known about her personal life.

Tsen lived through arguably one of the most socially and politically turbulent times in Chinese history, witnessing the collapse of the last Qing dynasty, as well as foreign intervention and invasions during the late nineteenth and twentieth centuries. Many of her experiences and the relationship with her country is reflected in her diary entries.

== Career ==
Tsen began her working career as a nurse at the local Methodist Women's Hospital. Three years later she advanced to become the administrator of the hospital. In 1910, she became the Director of Dormitory at the St. Hilda's Girls High School in Wuchang. For twelve years, she oversaw the students' room and board with careful consideration. In 1922, she was promoted to principal of the St. Hilda's Girls elementary school.

In September 1924 Tsen moved to Nanjing to become the director of dormitories of Ginling College, a Christian women's scholastic institution; she also worked as the nurse of the college. Many of the students appreciated Tsen's dedication to the school and fostered meaningful relationships with her. Tsen remained at Ginling College until June 19, 1942, when the Japanese army took over and removed her and other Ginling staff.

== Contribution ==
During the Japanese occupation of Nanjing, a substantial portion of Chinese citizens of a higher social standing chose to flee, but Tsen, at age sixty-two, remained behind in the safety zone of Nanjing in order to help.

A handful of Westerners also remained in the safety zone to help where they could. Among these Westerners was Minnie Vautrin, the acting president of Ginling College. Tsen was one of her most trusted assistants. Together, and with a small Chinese staff, they transformed the women's college into a refugee camp for women and children. Despite personal risk, these two women protected over 10,000 refugees in the camp they established, originally designed to house only 2,750. As the only nurse in Ginling, Tsen provided medical aid to the refugees. Additionally, she delivered babies and attended to the dying and was especially sympathetic to the miseries of the "big belly" (pregnant) women in the stifling conditions of the campus.

Alongside her responsibilities keeping the refugee camp running, in her spare time Tsen attended to the wounded Chinese soldiers at Hsia Kwan, a waterfront district of Nanjing outside the city wall.

In addition to her humanitarian work, Tsen maintained a daily diary, one of the few known in existence. This documented the Nanjing Massacre, the atrocities committed at the hands of occupying Japanese forces, and the subsequent suffering of women and children. This diary provides a rare primary historical source on one of the greatest atrocities committed in the modern era. Her diary (1937–1938) is the first known daily diary recorded by a Chinese citizen on the Rape of Nanjing. However, she kept this diary a secret, hiding it from Japanese soldiers. On August 8, 1945, Japan surrendered unconditionally. At the end of September, Tsen represented Ginling in an effort to reclaim the campus from the Japanese authorities and participated in Ginling's rehabilitation, at which she worked for months. On April 8, 1946, Tsen submitted written statements to the International Military Tribunal for the Far East, which conducted the Tokyo War Crimes Trial.

== Diary entry and excerpts ==
Tsen's diary is the first and only diary kept during the Nanjing Massacre from the viewpoint of a Chinese National. Although being written at the same time as Vautrin's and covering many of the same events, Tsen's diary reflects many sentiments unique to a Chinese national, with the added complexity of emotions she felt as she witness her country being subjected to atrocities. She expressed in many entries her anger and humiliation towards her country being ravaged by the Japanese soldiers, and unlike Vautrin, she does not feel that negotiation would be effective. Her fiery personality and spirit is reflected in her entries.

Tsen was also especially sympathetic towards pregnant women and helped to deliver many babies at the refugee camp. Her entries would include descriptions of her internal struggles as she describes what occurred during the day. As she writes on December 17, 1937:

"Now it is midnight. I am sitting here to write this diary and cannot go to sleep because tonight I have experienced the taste of being a slave of a toppled country. . . . This kind of slavery life is very difficult to endure. If I were not struggling for the survival of our Chinese race, I would commit suicide. . . .These several days, I have been frustrated to death, having no idea what's going on with the war, no communication with the outside world. Embassies have no Westerners left. Not many Americans are here, and they are helpless. The refugees come here to seek shelter and insist on coming in. It really made me angry to death. It's better not to let them in than see them being dragged from here; it is better not to see what happens to them outside. Each night, outside, every place is burning. . . . Why must Chinese people suffer like this? Today, several times soldiers went to the South Hill. I do not want to write anymore. When thinking about the Chinese people, I cannot help but feel heartbroken. Another boy was born today."

And on 18 December 1937 writing about the harsh conditions of:

"All the girls, except one, who were taken away last night were released and came back. [I have] no idea where the missing girl is or if she feels too ashamed to come back. [...]

These [Japanese soldiers] were extremely ruthless; they committed all kinds of crimes, killing and raping whomever they like, no matter young or old. One family has mother and daughter. The mother, over 60 years old, was raped by three soldiers consecutively, and daughter, 40-some years old, by two soldiers. Both of them are widows. It is extremely inhumane! [...] Now, Ginling has over 9,000 refugees. Outside and inside, walkways and hallways, people slept everywhere as if sardines packed in boxes."

On 30 December 1969 Tsen Shu Fang gave her statement to the International Military Tribunal for the Far East highlighting her experiences during the Massacre:

"Japanese soldiers would enter the grounds on the pretext of looking for soldiers but were in fact looking for our girls. Miss Vautrin was the foreign lady in charge here and she did a marvellous work in keeping the soldiers from carrying off our girls. In spite of all that she and I and the rest of us could do on the night of December 17, 1937, the soldiers entered the grounds and carried off eleven girls. Nine of these girls horribly raped and abused by Japanese officers later made their way back to our grounds. Mr. Mills saw them. We never heard any more of the other two girls. [...] The soldiers would burn private houses at night throughout the city just for sport or to keep themselves warm. We have a woman working at the village now whose husband, a merchant, was killed by Japanese soldiers and her home with her little child 3 months old burned by the Japanese soldiers.

== Legacy ==
Cheng Ruifang's diary is the first known daily diary recorded by a Chinese citizen on the Nanjing Massacre. Her diary is seen as proof of the violent nature of the invasion documenting the rape and murder committed by the Japanese soldiers. Minnie Vautrin also kept a diary that recorded her observance. The two diaries have detailed description of the war crimes Japanese soldiers committed on Ginling campus, revealing the suboptimal conditions women and children endure during the Nanjing Massacre.

The Second Historical Archives of China in Nanjing has collaborated with Nanjing Publishing Group, to edit and translate the diary into English and Japanese.
