= Field trace =

Mathematical function

In mathematics, the field trace is a particular function defined with respect to a finite field extension L/K, which is a K-linear map from L onto K.

== Definition ==
Let K be a field and L a finite extension (and hence an algebraic extension) of K. L can be viewed as a vector space over K. Multiplication by α, an element of L,

$$m_\alpha:L\to L \text{ given by } m_\alpha (x) = \alpha x$$,

is a K-linear transformation of this vector space into itself. The trace, Tr_{L/K}(α), is defined as the trace (in the linear algebra sense) of this linear transformation.

For α in L, let σ_{1}(α), ..., σ_{n}(α) be the roots (counted with multiplicity) of the minimal polynomial of α over K (in some extension field of K). Then

$$\operatorname{Tr}_{L/K}(\alpha) = [L:K(\alpha)]\sum_{j=1}^n\sigma_j(\alpha).$$

If L/K is separable then each root appears only once (however this does not mean the coefficient above is one; for example if α is the identity element 1 of K then the trace is [L:K] times 1).

More particularly, if L/K is a Galois extension and α is in L, then the trace of α is the sum of all the Galois conjugates of α, i.e.,

$$\operatorname{Tr}_{L/K}(\alpha)=\sum_{\sigma\in\operatorname{Gal}(L/K)}\sigma(\alpha),$$

where Gal(L/K) denotes the Galois group of L/K.

== Example ==
Let $L = \mathbb{Q}(\sqrt{d})$ be a quadratic extension of $\mathbb{Q}$. Then a basis of $L/\mathbb{Q}$ is $\{1, \sqrt{d}\}.$ If $\alpha = a + b\sqrt{d}$ then the matrix of $m_{\alpha}$ is:

$$\left [ \begin{matrix} a & bd \\ b & a \end{matrix} \right ]$$,

and so, $\operatorname{Tr}_{L/\mathbb{Q}}(\alpha) = [L:\mathbb{Q}(\alpha)]\left( \sigma_1(\alpha) + \sigma_2(\alpha)\right) = 1\times \left( \sigma_1(\alpha) + \overline{\sigma_1}(\alpha)\right) = a+b\sqrt{d} + a-b\sqrt{d} = 2a$. The minimal polynomial of α is X^{2} − 2a X + (a^{2} − db^{2}).

== Properties of the trace ==
Several properties of the trace function hold for any finite extension.

The trace Tr_{L/K} : L → K is a K-linear map (a K-linear functional), that is

$$\operatorname{Tr}_{L/K}(\alpha a + \beta b) = \alpha \operatorname{Tr}_{L/K}(a)+ \beta \operatorname{Tr}_{L/K}(b) \text{ for all }\alpha, \beta \in K$$.

If α ∈ K then $\operatorname{Tr}_{L/K}(\alpha) = [L:K] \alpha.$

Additionally, trace behaves well in towers of fields: if M is a finite extension of L, then the trace from M to K is just the composition of the trace from M to L with the trace from L to K, i.e.

$$\operatorname{Tr}_{M/K}=\operatorname{Tr}_{L/K}\circ\operatorname{Tr}_{M/L}$$.

== Finite fields ==
Let L = GF(q^{n}) be a finite extension of a finite field K = GF(q). Since L/K is a Galois extension, if α is in L, then the trace of α is the sum of all the Galois conjugates of α, i.e.

$$\operatorname{Tr}_{L/K}(\alpha)=\alpha + \alpha^q + \cdots + \alpha^{q^{n-1}}.$$

In this setting we have the additional properties:

- $\operatorname{Tr}_{L/K}(a^q) = \operatorname{Tr}_{L/K}(a) \text{ for } a \in L$.
- For any $\alpha \in K$, there are exactly $q^{n-1}$ elements $b\in L$ with $\operatorname{Tr}_{L/K}(b) = \alpha$.

Theorem. For b ∈ L, let F_{b} be the map $a \mapsto \operatorname{Tr}_{L/K}(ba).$ Then F_{b} ≠ F_{c} if b ≠ c. Moreover, the K-linear transformations from L to K are exactly the maps of the form F_{b} as b varies over the field L.

When K is the prime subfield of L, the trace is called the absolute trace and otherwise it is a relative trace.

=== Application ===
A quadratic equation, ax^{2} + bx + c = 0 with a ≠ 0, and coefficients in the finite field $\operatorname{GF}(q) = \mathbb{F}_q$ has either 0, 1 or 2 roots in GF(q) (and two roots, counted with multiplicity, in the quadratic extension GF(q^{2})). If the characteristic of GF(q) is odd, the discriminant Δ = b^{2} − 4ac indicates the number of roots in GF(q) and the classical quadratic formula gives the roots. However, when GF(q) has even characteristic (i.e., q = 2^{h} for some positive integer h), these formulas are no longer applicable.

Consider the quadratic equation ax^{2} + bx + c = 0 with coefficients in the finite field GF(2^{h}). If b = 0 then this equation has the unique solution $x = \sqrt{\frac{c}{a}}$ in GF(q). If b ≠ 0 then the substitution y = ax/b converts the quadratic equation to the form:

$$y^2 + y + \delta = 0, \text { where } \delta = \frac{ac}{b^2}.$$

This equation has two solutions in GF(q) if and only if the absolute trace $\operatorname{Tr}_{GF(q)/GF(2)}(\delta) = 0.$ In this case, if y = s is one of the solutions, then y = s + 1 is the other. Let k be any element of GF(q) with $\operatorname{Tr}_{GF(q)/GF(2)}(k) = 1.$ Then a solution to the equation is given by:

$$y = s = k \delta^2 + (k + k^2)\delta^4 + \ldots + (k + k^2 + \ldots + k^{2^{h-2}})\delta^{2^{h-1}}.$$

When h = 2m' + 1, a solution is given by the simpler expression:

$$y = s = \delta + \delta^{2^2} + \delta^{2^4} + \ldots + \delta^{2^{2m}}.$$

== Trace form ==
When L/K is separable, the trace provides a duality theory via the trace form: the map from L × L to K sending (x, y) to Tr_{L/K}(xy) is a nondegenerate, symmetric bilinear form called the trace form. If L/K is a Galois extension, the trace form is invariant with respect to the Galois group.

The trace form is used in algebraic number theory in the theory of the different ideal.

The trace form for a finite degree field extension L/K has non-negative signature for any field ordering of K. The converse, that every Witt equivalence class with non-negative signature contains a trace form, is true for algebraic number fields K.

If L/K is an inseparable extension, then the trace form is identically 0.

== See also ==
- Field norm
- Reduced trace
