= Tosun Terzioğlu =

Turkish mathematician

Tosun Terzioğlu (13 March 1942 − 23 February 2016) was a Turkish mathematician and academic administrator.

Terzioğlu was born in Istanbul, Turkey. He graduated from Robert College in 1961. He studied mathematics at Newcastle University, UK and received his BS in 1965. He earned his PhD from Frankfurt University in Germany in 1968. Between 1968 and 1994, he taught at Middle East Technical University (METU) in Ankara. He worked as a visiting professor at the University of Michigan between 1975 and 1976 and University of Wuppertal in Germany between 1982 and 1983. He had been the president of the Scientific and Technological Research Council of Turkey (TÜBİTAK) between 1992 and 1997. He was later the president of Sabancı University, Istanbul. He died at the age of 74 at Istanbul in 2016.

In the Mathematics Department at METU, there is a seminar room named after him.

His father, Nazim Terzioglu was also a mathematician.
