= Ali Ülger =

Turkish mathematician

Ali Ulger is a Turkish mathematician who works in the field of functional analysis. He got his PhD from University of Besançon in 1972. Between 1978 and 1996, he worked at Boğaziçi University. Then, he moved to Koç University where he still works as Professor of Mathematics.

In 1995, he got the most prestigious scientific award of Turkey, the Science Award of the Scientific and Technological Research Council of Turkey. He is also a member of Turkish Academy of Sciences.
