= Finite extensions of local fields =

Mathematical topic

In algebraic number theory, through completion, the study of ramification of a prime ideal can often be reduced to the case of local fields where a more detailed analysis can be carried out with the aid of tools such as ramification groups.

In this article, a local field is non-archimedean and has finite residue field.

== Unramified extension ==
Let $L/K$ be a finite Galois extension of nonarchimedean local fields with finite residue fields $\ell/k$ and Galois group $G$. Then the following are equivalent.

- (i) $L/K$ is unramified.
- (ii) $\mathcal{O}_L / \mathfrak{p}\mathcal{O}_L$ is a field, where $\mathfrak{p}$ is the maximal ideal of $\mathcal{O}_K$.
- (iii) $[L : K] = [\ell : k]$
- (iv) The inertia subgroup of $G$ is trivial.
- (v) If $\pi$ is a uniformizing element of $K$, then $\pi$ is also a uniformizing element of $L$.

When $L/K$ is unramified, by (iv) (or (iii)), G can be identified with $\operatorname{Gal}(\ell/k)$, which is finite cyclic.

The above implies that there is an equivalence of categories between the finite unramified extensions of a local field K and finite separable extensions of the residue field of K.

== Totally ramified extension ==
Again, let $L/K$ be a finite Galois extension of nonarchimedean local fields with finite residue fields $l/k$ and Galois group $G$. The following are equivalent.

- $L/K$ is totally ramified.
- $G$ coincides with its inertia subgroup.
- $L = K[\pi]$ where $\pi$ is a root of an Eisenstein polynomial.
- The norm $N(L/K)$ contains a uniformizer of $K$.

== See also ==
- Abhyankar's lemma
- Unramified morphism
