= Ideal norm =

In commutative algebra, the norm of an ideal is a generalization of a norm of an element in the field extension. It is particularly important in number theory since it measures the size of an ideal of a complicated number ring in terms of an ideal in a less complicated ring. When the less complicated number ring is taken to be the ring of integers, Z, then the norm of a nonzero ideal I of a number ring R is simply the size of the finite quotient ring R/I.

== Relative norm ==
Let A be a Dedekind domain with field of fractions K and integral closure of B in a finite separable extension L of K. (this implies that B is also a Dedekind domain.) Let $\mathcal{I}_A$ and $\mathcal{I}_B$ be the ideal groups of A and B, respectively (i.e., the sets of nonzero fractional ideals.) Following the technique developed by Jean-Pierre Serre, the norm map

$$N_{B/A}\colon \mathcal{I}_B \to \mathcal{I}_A$$

is the unique group homomorphism that satisfies

$$N_{B/A}(\mathfrak q) = \mathfrak{p}^{[B/\mathfrak q : A/\mathfrak p]}$$

for all nonzero prime ideals $\mathfrak q$ of B, where $\mathfrak p = \mathfrak q\cap A$ is the prime ideal of A lying below $\mathfrak q$.

Alternatively, for any $\mathfrak b\in\mathcal{I}_B$ one can equivalently define $N_{B/A}(\mathfrak{b})$ to be the fractional ideal of A generated by the set $\{ N_{L/K}(x) | x \in \mathfrak{b} \}$ of field norms of elements of B.

For $\mathfrak a \in \mathcal{I}_A$, one has $N_{B/A}(\mathfrak a B) = \mathfrak a^n$, where $n = [L : K]$.

The ideal norm of a principal ideal is thus compatible with the field norm of an element:

$N_{B/A}(xB) = N_{L/K}(x)A.$

Let $L/K$ be a Galois extension of number fields with rings of integers $\mathcal{O}_K\subset \mathcal{O}_L$.

Then the preceding applies with $A = \mathcal{O}_K, B = \mathcal{O}_L$, and for any $\mathfrak b\in\mathcal{I}_{\mathcal{O}_L}$ we have

$$N_{\mathcal{O}_L/\mathcal{O}_K}(\mathfrak b)= K \cap\prod_{\sigma \in \operatorname{Gal}(L/K)} \sigma (\mathfrak b),$$

which is an element of $\mathcal{I}_{\mathcal{O}_K}$.

The notation $N_{\mathcal{O}_L/\mathcal{O}_K}$ is sometimes shortened to $N_{L/K}$, an abuse of notation that is compatible with also writing $N_{L/K}$ for the field norm, as noted above.

In the case $K=\mathbb{Q}$, it is reasonable to use positive rational numbers as the range for $N_{\mathcal{O}_L/\mathbb{Z}}\,$ since $\mathbb{Z}$ has trivial ideal class group and unit group $\{\pm 1\}$, thus each nonzero fractional ideal of $\mathbb{Z}$ is generated by a uniquely determined positive rational number. Under this convention the relative norm from $L$ down to $K=\mathbb{Q}$ coincides with the absolute norm defined below.

== Absolute norm ==
Let $L$ be a number field with ring of integers $\mathcal{O}_L$, and $\mathfrak a$ a nonzero (integral) ideal of $\mathcal{O}_L$.

The absolute norm of $\mathfrak a$ is

$$N(\mathfrak a) :=\left [ \mathcal{O}_L: \mathfrak a\right ]=\left|\mathcal{O}_L/\mathfrak a\right|.\,$$

By convention, the norm of the zero ideal is taken to be zero.

If $\mathfrak a=(a)$ is a principal ideal, then

$N(\mathfrak a)=\left|N_{L/\mathbb{Q}}(a)\right|$.

The norm is completely multiplicative: if $\mathfrak a$ and $\mathfrak b$ are ideals of $\mathcal{O}_L$, then

$N(\mathfrak a\cdot\mathfrak b)=N(\mathfrak a)N(\mathfrak b)$.

Thus the absolute norm extends uniquely to a group homomorphism

$$N\colon\mathcal{I}_{\mathcal{O}_L}\to\mathbb{Q}_{>0}^\times,$$

defined for all nonzero fractional ideals of $\mathcal{O}_L$.

The norm of an ideal $\mathfrak a$ can be used to give an upper bound on the field norm of the smallest nonzero element it contains:

there always exists a nonzero $a\in\mathfrak a$ for which

$$\left|N_{L/\mathbb{Q}}(a)\right|\leq \left ( \frac{2}{\pi}\right )^s \sqrt{\left|\Delta_L\right|}N(\mathfrak a),$$

where

- $\Delta_L$ is the discriminant of $L$ and
- $s$ is the number of pairs of (non-real) complex embeddings of L into $\mathbb{C}$ (the number of complex places of L).

== See also ==
- Field norm
- Dedekind zeta function
