= Chiungtze C. Tsen =

Chinese mathematician (1898–1940)

1932 near Göttingen

Chiungtze C. Tsen (Chinese: 曾炯之; pinyin: Zēng Jiǒngzhī; Wade–Giles: Tseng Chiung-chih; Chang-Du Gan: [tsɛn˦˨ tɕjuŋ˨˩˧ tsɹ̩˦˨], (Note: Nanchang Fangyan Cidian and Hanyu Fangyin Zihui contain pronunciations of 曾 and 之, but not 炯 nor its homophone 迥. The pronunciation of 炯 is inferred from the article. To verify.) April 2, 1898 (Note: According to the genealogy of the Tsen family, he was born in the 23rd year of Guangxu (1897).) – October 1, 1940), given name Chiung (Chinese: 炯; pinyin: Jiǒng), (Note: Chiungtze was his courtesy name.) was a Chinese mathematician born in Nanchang, Jiangxi. He is known for his work in algebra. He was one of Emmy Noether's students at the University of Göttingen, Germany.

One of his research interests was quasi-algebraic closure. In that area he proved a fundamental result which is now called Tsen's theorem.

== Biography ==
Tsen was born in a poor fisherman's family in Xinjian Country, Nanchang, Jiangxi Province. His father Tschu-Wun Tsen (Note: Spelling used by Tsen in Germany.) (曾祖文 Zeng Zuwen) had two sons and several daughters, and Tsen was the eldest son. His uncle Lei Heng (雷恒), who was a jinshi and a member of the Hanlin Academy, persuaded Tsen's father to send Tsen to school. Due to poverty, Tsen had to take leaves from school intermittently to work. After leaving primary school, he worked in a coal mine while self-studying.

In 1917, he passed the entrance examination and was admitted to Jiangxi Provincial First Normal College in Nanchang. He was subsidised by Lei Heng's son Tsebu S. Lee (雷子布 Lei Zibu, given name 宣 Xuan), who was studying in Japan on government scholarship. After graduation in 1920, Tsen taught in primary school for two years. In 1922, Tsen entered National Wuchang Senior Normal College, later National Wuchang University, (Note: It was renamed to National Wuchang Normal University in 1923, and again to National Wuchang University in 1924, from which Tsen graduated. It has now become Wuhan University.) to study undergraduate mathematics, and he graduated in 1926. After graduation, he worked as teacher in high schools for two years to perform the mandatory teaching service of his degree.

In 1927, when Kuomintang split with the Chinese Communist Party, Tsen and some teachers and students protested against the breakup and called for alliance. Several of them including Tsen were beaten up and were hospitalized. Guo Moruo, then serving as director of the political department of the National Revolutionary Army, visited them in the hospital.

In 1928, Tsen passed the Jiangxi provincial government scholarship examination for studying in Europe and America. He went to Berlin University for language training for a year, and then he started studying mathematics at University of Göttingen in the summer semester of 1929. He studied algebra under Emmy Noether. Tsen received his doctoral degree in February 1934 under the supervision of Emmy Noether and Friedrich Karl Schmidt, and he dedicated his dissertation to his elder cousin Tsebu S. Lee. Having fled to the US, Noether evaluated the dissertation in a letter as "sehr gut" (very good). As a research fellow sponsored by the China Foundation for the Promotion of Education and Culture, Tsen did a postdoctoral research with Emil Artin at Hamburg University for a year. There he became friend with Shiing-Shen Chern, who was a graduate student back then. Chern remembered him as a cordial and open-minded person well-liked by everyone.

Tsen returned to China in July 1935 and was invited by Chen Jiangong to National Chekiang University in Hangzhou as professor in the area of algebra. Chen was Tsen's teacher at Wuchang Senior Normal College and had encouraged Tsen to study in Germany. Tsen taught a course on algebra and a course on group theory based on the German textbooks of van der Waerden and Andreas Speiser respectively. As the books were in German, it was not easy for the students to understand, so he edited the notes taken by his student Chuan-Chih Hsiung and printed out for the students.

In 1936, Tsen published his third paper in the journal of the new Chinese Mathematical Society. The paper contained the work that he had done in Hamburg, and he dedicated it to the memory of his advisor Noether, who died in the previous year. The paper was hardly known outside China before 1970s, and the results therein were rediscovered by Serge Lang in his dissertation. Ernst Witt, who was Tsen's friend and had also been a student of Noether, always talked about Tsen's results in his algebra lectures and would correct others if they attributed them to Lang but not Tsen, thus helped bring attention to this paper.

Tsen and Chen fell out because of a failed matching of Tsen and Chen's younger sister for marriage. In 1937, Tsen left Chekiang University and was invited by National Beiyang Institute of Technology to become a professor. That year, the full-scale Japanese invasion of China started, and the school was evacuated from Tianjin to Xi'an. Tsen went to Xi'an to take up his post. The school merged with some other evacuated universities to form National Xi'an Provisory University. The new university moved to Hanzhong and was renamed to National Northwestern Associated University, and it moved again to Chenggu. The university soon split into several schools, one of which was National Northwestern Institute of Technology, and Tsen became a professor of this school.

He married a high-school chemistry teacher Qin Hesui (秦禾穗) in Nanchang in 1937. His wife suffered a miscarriage on the long and difficult journey over mountainous terrains to Xichang. They had no children. He adopted a nephew as his son.

He bought a lot of mathematics books while in Germany, and he brought the books and his manuscripts back to China in seven full metal trunks. After the start of war, he kept them in his relative's home at a village in Xinjian, Jiangxi. Unfortunately, when the village had fallen, all his seven trunks of books and manuscripts were burnt by the Japanese invaders.

In 1939, Shu-tien Li, former president of Beiyang Institute of Technology and the president of the newly founded National Xikang Institute of Technology, invited Tsen to be a professor at the new school. The campus of the school was temples scattered on Mount Lu in the suburb of Xichang in Xikang Province. Tsen had a chronic stomach problem, and his condition was made worse by poor living condition and shortage of medical supplies in time of war. Tsen died of a stomach ulcer in Xichang, Xikang on October 1, 1940, and the school held a memorial service for him on November 18, 1940. (Note: His date of death was recorded on a local journal in Xichang. However, the date was forgotten for decades. Many sources mistakenly quote his date of death as November 1940.)

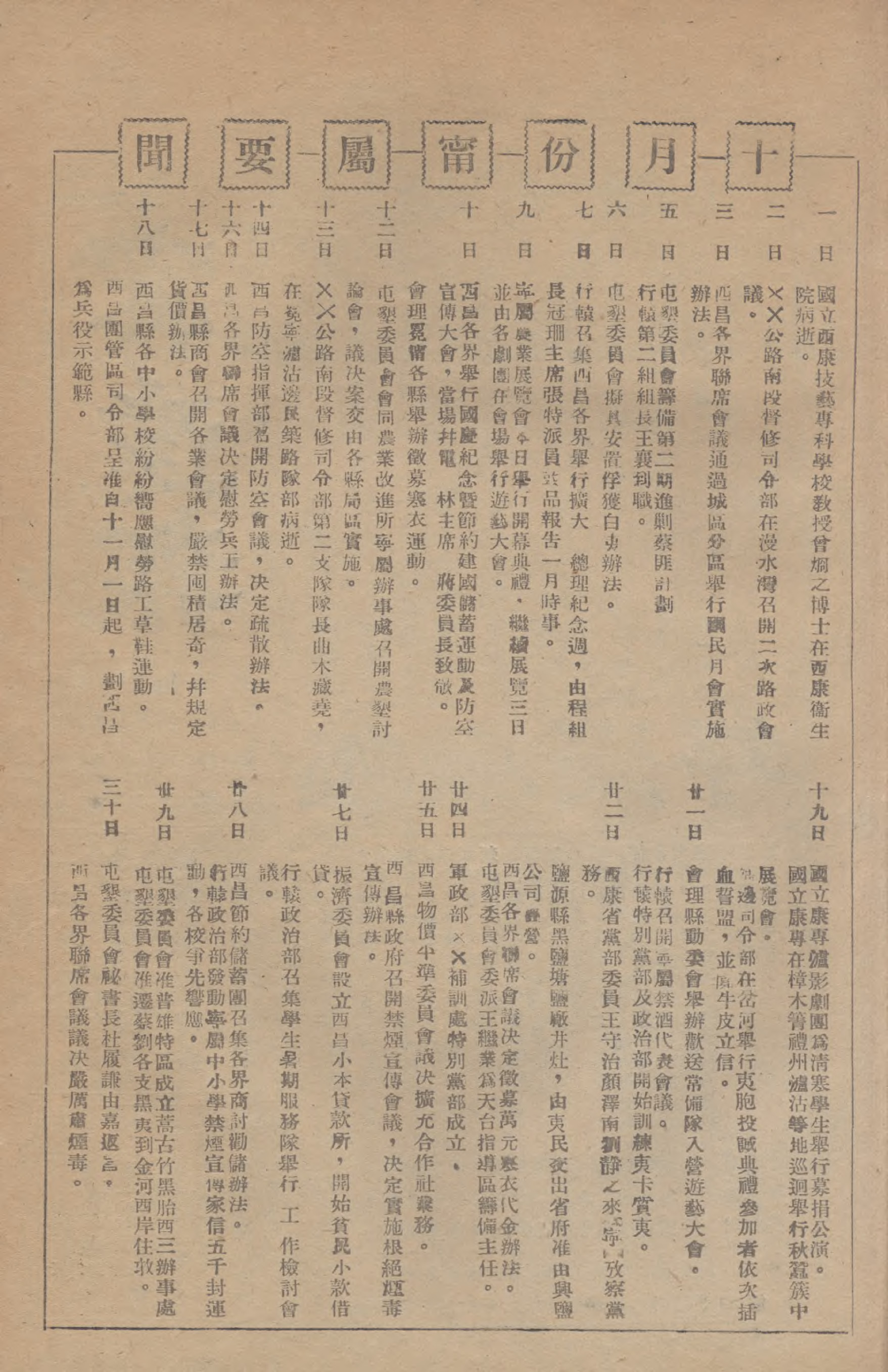
Tsen's death reported by the journal Xin Ningyuan Yuekang, Vol. 1, No. 3.

== Publications ==
- Tsen, Chiungtze C. Divisionsalgebren über Funktionenkörpern. Nachr. Ges. Wiss. Göttingen, Math.-Phys. Kl. I, No.44, II, No.48, 335–339 (1933).
- Tsen, Chiungtze C. Algebren über Funktionenkörpern. Göttingen: Diss. 19 S. (1934).
- Tsen, Chiungtze C. Zur Stufentheorie der quasialgebraisch-Abgeschlossenheit kommutativer Körper. J. Chin. Math. Soc. 1, 81–92 (1936).

A Chinese translation of these three papers was published in a book in memory of Tsen.

=== Short articles ===
Some short articles written by Tsen in Chinese that can be found:

- 曾烱 Zeng Jiong (1924). "Faa de Bruno's Theorem". 國立武昌師範大學數理化雜誌 Guoli Wuchang Shifan Daxue Shulihua Zazhi (12): 38–41.
- 曾烱 Zeng Jiong (1930). "實數表示法及其應用一題問 Shishu Biaoshifa Ji Qi Yingyong Yiti Wen". 留德學誌 Liu de Xuezhi (1): 25–30.
- 曾烱 Zeng Jiong (1933). "數學討論（一） Shuxue Taolun (Yi)". 山東大學科學叢刊 Shandong Daxue Kexue Congkan. 1 (1): 24–26.

== See also ==
- Tsen rank
