= Field norm =

Concept in field theory mathematics

In mathematics, the (field) norm is a particular mapping defined in field theory, which maps elements of a larger field into a subfield.

== Formal definition ==
Let K be a field and L a finite extension (and hence an algebraic extension) of K.

The field L is then a finite-dimensional vector space over K.

Multiplication by α, an element of L,

$$m_\alpha\colon L\to L$$
$$m_\alpha (x) = \alpha x$$,

is a K-linear transformation of this vector space into itself.

The norm, N_{L/K}(α), is defined as the determinant of this linear transformation.

If L/K is a Galois extension, one may compute the norm of α ∈ L as the product of all the Galois conjugates of α:

$$\operatorname{N}_{L/K}(\alpha) = \! \prod_{\sigma\in\operatorname{Gal}(L/K)} \!\! \sigma(\alpha),$$

where Gal(L/K) denotes the Galois group of L/K. (Note that there may be a repetition in the terms of the product.)

For a general field extension L/K, and nonzero α in L, let σ_{1}(α), ..., σ_{n}(α) be the roots of the minimal polynomial of α over K (roots listed with multiplicity and lying in some extension field of L); then

$$\operatorname{N}_{L/K}(\alpha)=\biggl(\prod_{j=1}^n\sigma_j(\alpha) \biggr)^{[L:K(\alpha)]}$$.

If L/K is separable, then each root appears only once in the product (though the exponent, the degree [L:K(α)], may still be greater than 1).

== Examples ==
=== Quadratic field extensions ===
One of the basic examples of norms comes from quadratic field extensions $\Q(\sqrt{a})/\Q$ where $a$ is a square-free integer.

Then, the multiplication map by $\sqrt{a}$ on an element $x + y \cdot \sqrt{a}$ is

$$\sqrt{a}\cdot (x + y\cdot\sqrt{a}) = y \cdot a +  x \cdot \sqrt{a}.$$

The element $x + y \cdot \sqrt{a}$ can be represented by the vector

$$\begin{bmatrix}x \\ y\end{bmatrix},$$

since there is a direct sum decomposition $\Q(\sqrt{a}) = \Q\oplus \Q\cdot\sqrt{a}$ as a $\Q$-vector space.

The matrix of $m_\sqrt{a}$ is then

$$m_{\sqrt{a}} = \begin{bmatrix}
0 & a \\
1 & 0
\end{bmatrix}$$

and the norm is $N_{\Q(\sqrt{a})/\Q}(\sqrt{a}) = -a$, since it is the determinant of this matrix.

==== Norm of Q(√2) ====
Consider the number field $K=\Q(\sqrt{2})$.

The Galois group of $K$ over $\Q$ has order $d = 2$ and is generated by the element which sends $\sqrt{2}$ to $-\sqrt{2}$. So the norm of $1+\sqrt{2}$ is:

$$(1+\sqrt{2})(1-\sqrt{2}) = -1.$$

The field norm can also be obtained without the Galois group.

Fix a $\Q$-basis of $\Q(\sqrt{2})$, say:

$$\{1,\sqrt{2}\}$$.

Then multiplication by the number $1+\sqrt{2}$ sends

$1$ to $1+\sqrt{2}$ and
$\sqrt{2}$ to $2+\sqrt{2}$.

So the determinant of "multiplying by $1+\sqrt{2}$" is the determinant of the matrix which sends the vector

$$\begin{bmatrix}1 \\ 0\end{bmatrix}$$
(corresponding to the first basis element, i.e., 1) to
$$\begin{bmatrix}1 \\ 1\end{bmatrix}$$,
$$\begin{bmatrix}0 \\ 1\end{bmatrix}$$
(corresponding to the second basis element, i.e., $\sqrt{2}$) to
$$\begin{bmatrix}2 \\ 1\end{bmatrix}$$,

viz.:

$$\begin{bmatrix}1 & 2 \\1 & 1 \end{bmatrix}.$$

The determinant of this matrix is −1.

=== p-th root field extensions ===
Another easy class of examples comes from field extensions of the form $\mathbb{Q}(\sqrt[p]{a})/\mathbb{Q}$ where the prime factorization of $a \in \mathbb{Q}$ contains no $p$-th powers, for $p$ a fixed odd prime.

The multiplication map by $\sqrt[p]{a}$ of an element is

$$\begin{align}
m_{\sqrt[p]{a}}(x) &= \sqrt[p]{a} \cdot (a_0 + a_1\sqrt[p]{a} + a_2\sqrt[p]{a^2} + \cdots + a_{p-1}\sqrt[p]{a^{p-1}} )\\
&= a_0\sqrt[p]{a} + a_1\sqrt[p]{a^2} + a_2\sqrt[p]{a^3} + \cdots + a_{p-1}a
\end{align}$$

giving the matrix

$$\begin{bmatrix}
0 & 0 & \cdots & 0 & a \\
1 & 0 & \cdots & 0 & 0 \\
0 & 1 & \cdots & 0 & 0 \\
\vdots & \vdots & \ddots  & \vdots & \vdots \\
0 & 0 & \cdots & 1 & 0
\end{bmatrix}$$

The determinant gives the norm

$$N_{\mathbb{Q}(\sqrt[p]{a})/\mathbb{Q}}(\sqrt[p]{a}) = (-1)^{p-1} a = a.$$

=== Complex numbers over the reals ===
The field norm from the complex numbers to the real numbers sends

x + iy

to

x^{2} + y^{2},

because the Galois group of $\Complex$ over $\R$ has two elements,

- the identity element and
- complex conjugation,

and taking the product yields (x + iy)(x − iy) = x^{2} + y^{2}.

=== Finite fields ===
Let L = GF(q^{n}) be a finite extension of a finite field K = GF(q).

Since L/K is a Galois extension, if α is in L, then the norm of α is the product of all the Galois conjugates of α, i.e.

$$\operatorname{N}_{L/K}(\alpha)=\alpha \cdot \alpha^q \cdot \alpha^{q^2} \cdots \alpha^{q^{n-1}} = \alpha^{(q^n - 1)/(q-1)}.$$

In this setting we have the additional properties,

- $\forall \alpha \in L, \quad \operatorname{N}_{L/K}(\alpha^q) = \operatorname{N}_{L/K}(\alpha)$
- $\forall a \in K, \quad \operatorname{N}_{L/K}(a) = a^n.$

== Properties of the norm ==
Several properties of the norm function hold for any finite extension.

=== Group homomorphism ===
The norm N_{L/K} : L* → K* is a group homomorphism from the multiplicative group of L to the multiplicative group of K, that is

$$\operatorname{N}_{L/K}(\alpha \beta) = \operatorname{N}_{L/K}(\alpha) \operatorname{N}_{L/K}(\beta) \text{ for all }\alpha, \beta \in L^*.$$

Furthermore, if $a \in K$:

$\operatorname{N}_{L/K}(a \alpha) = a^{[L:K]} \operatorname{N}_{L/K}(\alpha) \text{ for all }\alpha \in L,$ and
$$\operatorname{N}_{L/K}(a) = a^{[L:K]}.$$

=== Composition with field extensions ===
Additionally, the norm behaves well in towers of fields:

if M is a finite extension of L, then the norm from M to K is just the composition of the norm from M to L with the norm from L to K, i.e.

$$\operatorname{N}_{M/K}=\operatorname{N}_{L/K}\circ\operatorname{N}_{M/L}.$$

=== Reduction of the norm ===
The norm of an element in an arbitrary field extension can be reduced to an easier computation if the degree of the field extension is already known. This is

$N_{L/K}(\alpha) = N_{K(\alpha)/K}(\alpha)^{[L:K(\alpha)]}$

For example, for $\alpha = \sqrt{2}$ in the field extension $L = \mathbb{Q}(\sqrt{2},\zeta_3), K =\mathbb{Q}$, the norm of $\alpha$ is

$$\begin{align}
N_{\mathbb{Q}(\sqrt{2},\zeta_3)/\mathbb{Q}}(\sqrt{2}) &= N_{\mathbb{Q}(\sqrt{2})/\mathbb{Q}}(\sqrt{2})^{[\mathbb{Q}(\sqrt{2},\zeta_3):\mathbb{Q}(\sqrt{2})]}\\
&= (-2)^{2}\\
&= 4
\end{align}$$

since the degree of the field extension $L/K(\alpha)$ is $2$.

=== Detection of units ===
For $\mathcal{O}_K$ the ring of integers of an algebraic number field $K$, an element $\alpha \in \mathcal{O}_K$ is a unit if and only if $N_{K/\mathbb{Q}}(\alpha) = \pm 1$.

For instance

$$N_{\mathbb{Q}(\zeta_3)/\mathbb{Q}}(\zeta_3) = 1$$

where

$$\zeta_3^3 = 1$$.

Thus, any number field $K$ whose ring of integers $\mathcal{O}_K$ contains $\zeta_3$ has it as a unit.

== Further properties ==
The norm of an algebraic integer is again an integer, because it is equal (up to sign) to the constant term of the characteristic polynomial.

In algebraic number theory one defines also norms for ideals. This is done in such a way that if I is a nonzero ideal of O_{K}, the ring of integers of the number field K, N(I) is the number of residue classes in $O_K / I$ – i.e. the cardinality of this finite ring. Hence this ideal norm is always a positive integer.

When I is a principal ideal αO_{K} then N(I) is equal to the absolute value of the norm to Q of α, for α an algebraic integer.

== See also ==
- Field trace
- Ideal norm
- Norm form
