= Hasse–Arf theorem =

On jumps of upper numbering filtration of the Galois group of a finite Galois extension

In mathematics, specifically in local class field theory, the Hasse–Arf theorem is a result concerning jumps of the upper numbering filtration of the Galois group of a finite Galois extension. A special case of it when the residue fields are finite was originally proved by Helmut Hasse, and the general result was proved by Cahit Arf.

== Statement ==
=== Higher ramification groups ===
The theorem deals with the upper numbered higher ramification groups of a finite abelian extension $L/K$. So assume $L/K$ is a finite Galois extension, and that $v_K$ is a discrete normalised valuation of K, whose residue field has characteristic p > 0, and which admits a unique extension to L, say w. Denote by $v_L$ the associated normalised valuation ew of L and let $\scriptstyle{\mathcal{O}}$ be the valuation ring of L under $v_L$. Let $L/K$ have Galois group G and define the s-th ramification group of $L/K$ for any real s ≥ −1 by

$$G_s(L/K)=\{\sigma\in G\,:\,v_L(\sigma a-a)\geq s+1 \text{ for all }a\in\mathcal{O}\}.$$

So, for example, G_{−1} is the Galois group G. To pass to the upper numbering one has to define the function ψ_{L/K} which in turn is the inverse of the function η_{L/K} defined by

$$\eta_{L/K}(s)=\int_0^s \frac{dx}{|G_0:G_x|}.$$

The upper numbering of the ramification groups is then defined by G^{t}(L/K) = G_{s}(L/K) where s = ψ_{L/K}(t).

These higher ramification groups G^{t}(L/K) are defined for any real t ≥ −1, but since v_{L} is a discrete valuation, the groups will change in discrete jumps and not continuously. Thus we say that t is a jump of the filtration {G^{t}(L/K) : t ≥ −1} if G^{t}(L/K) ≠ G^{u}(L/K) for any u > t. The Hasse–Arf theorem tells us the arithmetic nature of these jumps.

=== Statement of the theorem ===
With the above set up of an abelian extension L/K, the theorem states that the jumps of the filtration {G^{t}(L/K) : t ≥ −1} are all rational integers.

== Example ==
Suppose G is cyclic of order $p^n$, $p$ residue characteristic and $G(i)$ be the subgroup of $G$ of order $p^{n-i}$. The theorem says that there exist positive integers $i_0, i_1, ..., i_{n-1}$ such that

$$G_0 = \cdots = G_{i_0} = G = G^0 = \cdots = G^{i_0}$$
$$G_{i_0 + 1} = \cdots = G_{i_0 + p i_1} = G(1) = G^{i_0 + 1} = \cdots = G^{i_0 + i_1}$$
$$G_{i_0 + p i_1 + 1} = \cdots = G_{i_0 + p i_1 + p^2 i_2} = G(2) = G^{i_0 + i_1 + 1}$$
...
$G_{i_0 + p i_1 + \cdots + p^{n-1}i_{n-1} + 1} = 1 = G^{i_0 + \cdots + i_{n-1} + 1}.$

== Non-abelian extensions ==
For non-abelian extensions the jumps in the upper filtration need not be at integers. Jean-Pierre Serre gave an example of a totally ramified extension with Galois group the quaternion group $Q_8$ of order 8 with

- $G_0 = Q_8$
- $G_1 = Q_8$
- $G_2 = \Z/2\Z$
- $G_3 = \Z/2\Z$
- $G_4 = 1$

The upper numbering then satisfies

- $G^n = Q_8$ for $n \leq 1$
- $G^n = \Z/2\Z$ for $1 < n\leq 3/2$
- $G^n = 1$ for $3/2 < n$

so has a jump at the non-integral value $n=3/2$.
