= Michael Drmota =

Austrian mathematician (born 1964)

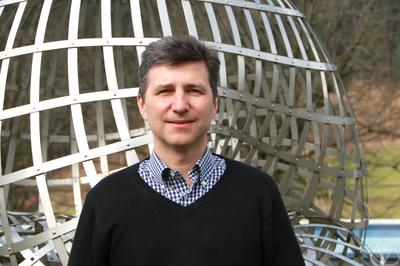
- Drmota at Oberwolfach, 2014
- Born: 17 July 1964 (age 62); Vienna, Austria
- Education: TU Wien
- Scientific career
- Fields: Mathematics
- Workplaces: TU Wien
- Doctoral advisors: Robert F. Tichy

Michael Drmota (born 17 July 1964 in Vienna) is an Austrian mathematician and professor at TU Wien.

He studied Mathematics at TU Wien and finished his PhD in 1986 under the supervision of Robert F. Tichy. At the same university he acquired habilitation in 1990 and is now full professor at the Institute of Discrete Mathematics and Geometry, where he also served as head of institute from 2004 to 2012.

He had visiting professor positions at UVSQ, University Paris VI, and University of Provence (Marseille). From 2013 until 2019 he was dean of the Faculty of Mathematics and Geoinformation, from 2010 to 2013 president of the Austrian Mathematical Society. Since 2013 he is corresponding member of the Austrian Academy of Sciences.

In 1992 he won the Edmund und Rosa Hlawka-Preis of the Austrian Academy of Sciences, and 1996 the Prize of the Austrian Mathematical Society. In 2023, he got awarded the Flajolet Lecture Prize.

His research areas are number theory, enumerative combinatorics, analysis of algorithms and stochastic processes on combinatorial structures.

== Selected publications ==
- Michael, Drmota; Tichy, Robert F. (1997). Sequences, discrepancies and applications. Lecture Notes in Mathematics. Vol. 1651. Springer-Verlag, Berlin. ISBN 978-3-540-68333-9.
- Michael, Drmota (2009). Random trees: An interplay between combinatorics and probability. Springer-Verlag, Wien. ISBN 978-3-211-75357-6.
