= Schmetterer =

Schmetterer is a German surname that means Smasher. Notable people with the surname include:

- Bob Schmetterer (1943–2026), American business executive & author
- Leopold Schmetterer (1919–2004), Austrian mathematician
- Benjamin Schmetterer (1926–2008), Founder and CEO of Crawford Labs now on NYSE:TNC
- Brandon Schmetterer (1998–2023), Global Markets Analyst at Bank of Montreal Capital Markets & Schmettgala Events Founder.
