= Robert F. Tichy =

Austrian mathematician (born 1957)

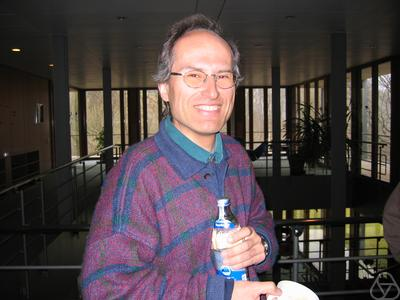
- Robert Tichy in 2004
- Born: 30 November 1957 (age 68); Vienna, Austria
- Education: University of Vienna
- Scientific career
- Fields: Mathematics
- Workplaces: Vienna University of Technology, Graz University of Technology
- Doctoral advisors: Edmund Hlawka
- Notable students: Michael Drmota, Martin Goldstern

Robert Franz Tichy (born 30 September 1957) is an Austrian mathematician and professor at Graz University of Technology.

He studied mathematics at the University of Vienna and finished 1979 with a Ph.D. thesis on uniform distribution under the supervision of Edmund Hlawka. He received his habilitation at TU Wien in 1983. Currently he is a professor at the Institute for Analysis and Number Theory at TU Graz. Previous positions include head of the Department of Mathematics and Dean of the Faculty of Mathematics, Physics and Geodesy at TU Graz, President of the Austrian Mathematical Society, and Member of the Board (Kuratorium) of the FWF, the Austrian Science Foundation.

His research deals with Number theory, Analysis and Actuarial mathematics, and in particular with number theoretic algorithms, digital expansions, diophantine problems, combinatorial and asymptotic analysis, quasi Monte Carlo methods and actuarial risk models. Among his contributions are results in discrepancy theory, a criterion (joint with Yuri Bilu) for the finiteness of the solution set of a separable diophantine equation, as well as investigations of graph theoretic indices and of combinatorial algorithms with analytic methods. He also investigated (with Istvan Berkes and Walter Philipp) pseudorandom properties of lacunary sequences.

In the theory of equidistribution he solved (with Harald Niederreiter) an open problem of Donald Knuth's book The Art of Computer Programming, by showing that for any sequence $(n_0,n_1,\dots)$ of distinct natural numbers the sequence $(\alpha^{n_0},\alpha^{n_1},\alpha^{n_2},\dots)$ is completely uniformly distributed for almost all real numbers $\alpha > 1$; as a corollary, for almost all real numbers $\alpha > 1$ the sequence $(\alpha,\alpha^2,\alpha^3,\dots)$ is random in the sense of Knuth's definition R4.

Tichy is interested in the history of Alpinism and is also an avid climber.

In 1985 he received the Prize of the Austrian Mathematical Society. Since 2004 he has been a Corresponding Member of the Austrian Academy of Sciences. In 2017 he received an honorary doctorate from the University of Debrecen. He taught as a visiting professor at the University of Illinois at Urbana–Champaign and the Tata Institute of Fundamental Research. In 2017 he was a guest professor at Paris 7; in the winter semester 2020/21 he held the Morlet chair at the Centre International de Rencontres Mathématiques in Luminy.

== Selected publications ==
- Drmota, Michael; Tichy, Robert F. (1997). Sequences, discrepancies and applications. Lecture Notes in Mathematics. Vol. 1651. Springer-Verlag. pp. xiv+506. ISBN 3-540-62606-9..
- Tichy, Robert; Waller, Johannes (2009), "Johannes Frischauf – eine schillernde Persönlichkeit in Mathematik und Alpinismus" (PDF), Internat. Math. Nachrichten (210): 21–32.
- Berkes, István; Philipp, Walter; Tichy, Robert F. (2007), "Pseudorandom numbers and entropy conditions", Journal of Complexity, 23 (4–6): 516–527, doi:10.1016/j.jco.2006.12.002, ISSN 0885-064X.
- Albrecher, Hansjörg; Teugels, Jozef L.; Tichy, Robert F. (2001), "On a gamma series expansion for the time-dependent probability of collective ruin", Insurance: Mathematics and Economics, 29 (3): 345–355, doi:10.1016/S0167-6687(01)00080-4, ISSN 0167-6687.
- Bilu, Yuri F.; Tichy, Robert F. (2000), "The Diophantine equation f(x)=g(y)", Acta Arithmetica, 95 (3): 261–288, doi:10.4064/aa-95-3-261-288, MR 1793164.
- Flajolet, Philippe; Grabner, Peter; Kirschenhofer, Peter; Prodinger, Helmut; Tichy, Robert F. (1994), "Mellin transforms and asymptotics: digital sums" (PDF), Theoretical Computer Science, 123 (2): 291–314, doi:10.1016/0304-3975(92)00065-Y, ISSN 0304-3975.
- Tichy, Robert (1987), "Ein metrischer Satz über vollständig gleichverteilte Folgen", Acta Arithmetica, 48 (2): 197–207, doi:10.4064/aa-48-2-197-207, ISSN 0065-1036.
- Niederreiter, Harald; Tichy, Robert F. (1985), "Solution of a problem of Knuth on complete uniform distribution of sequences", Mathematika, 32 (1): 26–32, doi:10.1112/S0025579300010810, MR 0817103.
- Prodinger, Helmut; Tichy, Robert F (1982), "Fibonacci numbers of graphs" (PDF), Fibonacci Quarterly, 20 (1): 16–21, MR 0660753.
