= Goldstern =

Goldstern is a surname, meaning "gold star" in the German language, referring to the star (or shield) of King David. Notable people named Goldstern include:

- Eugenie Goldstern (1884–1942), Austrian anthropologist
- Martin Goldstern (1963), Austrian mathematician and university professor for set theory
