= Peter M. Gruber =

Austrian mathematician

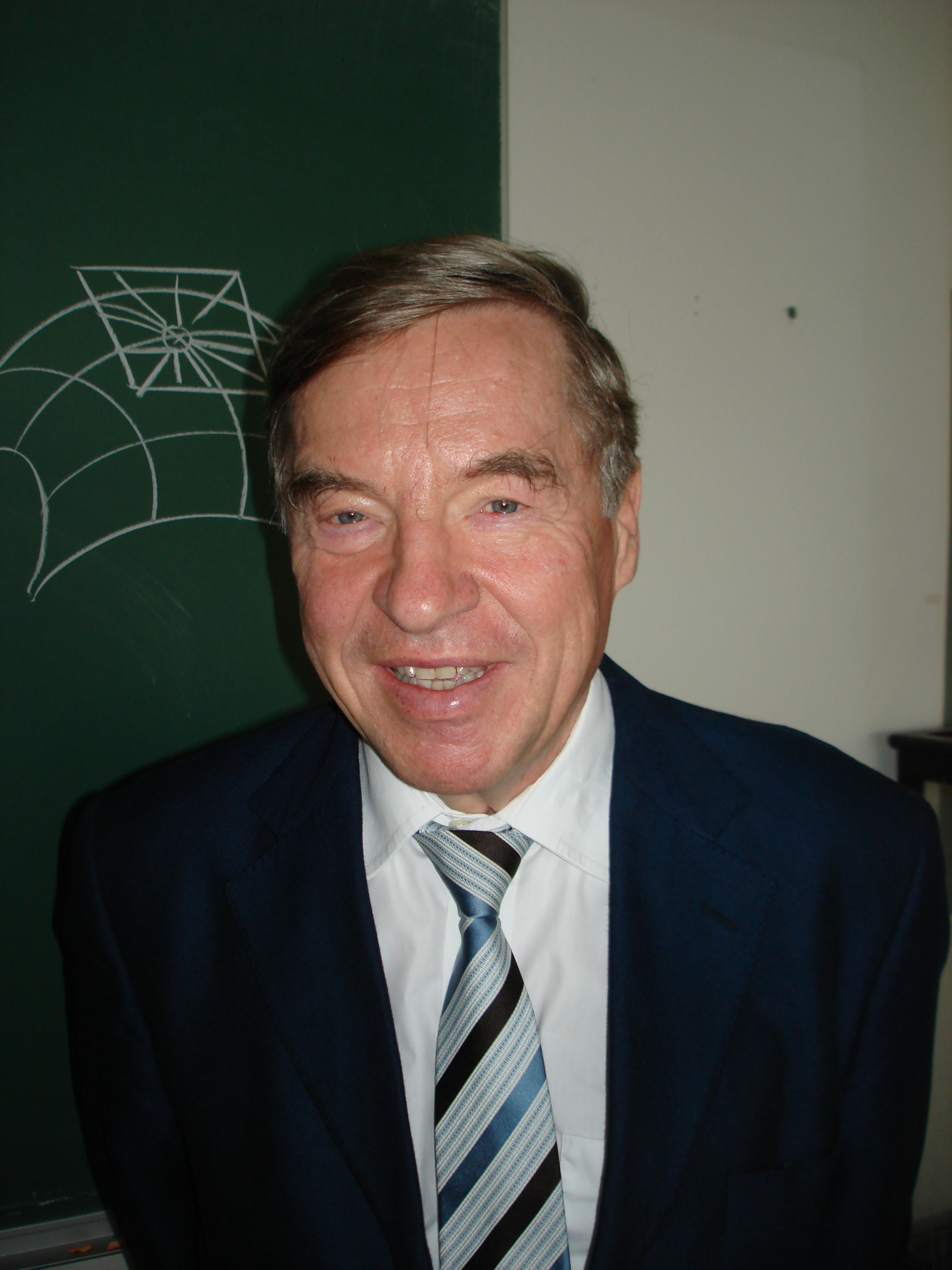
Peter M. Gruber

Peter Manfred Gruber (28 August 1941, Klagenfurt – 7 March 2017, Vienna) was an Austrian mathematician working in geometric number theory as well as in convex and discrete geometry.

== Biography ==
Gruber obtained his PhD at the University of Vienna in 1966, under the supervision of Nikolaus Hofreiter. From 1971, he was Professor at the University of Linz, and from 1976, at the TU Wien. He was a member of the Austrian Academy of Sciences, a foreign member of the Russian Academy of Sciences, and a corresponding member of the Bavarian Academy of Sciences and Humanities.

His past doctoral students include Monika Ludwig.

== Selected publications ==
- Gruber, P.M. (2007). Convex and Discrete Geometry. Berlin: Springer-Verlag.
- Gruber, P.M.; Lekkerkerker, C.G. (1987). Geometry of Numbers. Amsterdam: North-Holland.

== Decorations and awards ==
- 1967: Prize of the Austrian Mathematical Society
- 1978, 1980 and 1982: Chairman of the Austrian Mathematical Society
- 1991: Full member of the Austrian Academy of Sciences (Corresponding member since 1988)
- 1996: Medal of the Union of Czech Mathematicians and Physicists
- 2001: Austrian Cross of Honour for Science and Art, 1st class
- 2001: Medal of the mathematical and physical faculty of Charles University in Prague
- 2003: Foreign member of the Russian Academy of Sciences
- 2008: Grand Silver Medal for Services to the Republic of Austria
- 2013: Fellow of the American Mathematical Society, for "contributions to the geometry of numbers and to convex and discrete geometry".
- Honorary doctorates from the Universities of Siegen, Turin and Salzburg
- Member of the Academies of Sciences in Messina and Modena
- Corresponding member of the Bavarian Academy of Sciences
