= Fleischner =

Fleischner is a German-language surname literally meaning butcher. Notable people with the surname include:

- Felix Fleischner
- Herbert Fleischner (1944–2025), Austrian mathematician
- Karel Fleischner
- Richard Fleischner
- Sam Fleischner
