= Messner Vetere Berger McNamee Schmetterer/Euro RSCG =

Messner Vetere Berger McNamee Schmetterer
- Formerly: Messner Vetere Berger Carey Messner Vetere Berger Carey Schmetterer Messner Vetere Berger Carey Schmetterer RSCG Messner Vetere Berger McNamee Schmetterer/Euro RSCG
- Industry: Advertising agency
- Founded: 1986; 39 years ago
- Founders: Tom Messner; Barry Vetere; Ron Berger; Wally Carey; Louise McNamee; Bob Schmetterer
- Fate: Acquired by RSCG (now Havas)
- Headquarters: New York City, United States

Messner Vetere Berger McNamee Schmetterer was an American advertising agency in New York City.

Founded in 1986, it has had several name changes:

- Messner Vetere Berger Carey
- Messner Vetere Berger Carey Schmetterer
- Messner Vetere Berger Carey Schmetterer RSCG
- Messner Vetere Berger McNamee Schmetterer/Euro RSCG

The principals whose names have appeared in the company name are Tom Messner, Barry Vetere, Ron Berger, Wally Carey, Louise McNamee and Bob Schmetterer.

Through the 1990s, the agency was the fastest-growing major agency in the advertising industry, and clients included Volvo, MCI, Evian, Schering Plough, and Nestlé, not to mention Intel, Peugeot, 1-800-COLLECT, NEW BALANCE, BUSH FOR PRESIDENT (1988), Commodore Computers, Atari Computers, Windstar Cruises, Select Comfort Mattresses, Club Med, Dunkin Donuts, Subway, and The Catholic Big Sisters.

Messner Vetere Berger Carey Schmetterer was acquired by French Advertising agency RSCG. In 1994, Euro RSCG owned 60.8% of Messner Vetere Berger McNamee Schmetterer/Euro RSCG. In 1994, when Wired magazine launched its website HotWired and pioneered banner ads on the web, Messner Vetere Berger Carey Schmetterer RSCG was the first agency ever to place banner ads on the website (and on the web) for its clients.

Euro RSCG later was acquired by Eurocom, a division of Havas. The agency became the New York office of RSCG and RSCG became the Paris office of Messner Vetere Berger Carey Schmetterer.
