= Theory of Games and Economic Behavior =

Book by John von Neumann and Oskar Morgenstern

- 60th anniversary edition, 2004
- Author: John von Neumann; Oskar Morgenstern
- Language: English
- Subject: Game theory
- Genre: Non-fiction
- Publisher: Princeton University Press
- Publication date: 1944
- Publication place: United States
- Media type: Print, e-book
- Pages: xviii + 625 pages (1st ed.)
- ISBN: 978-0-691-13061-3 (60th anniversary edition)
- OCLC: 1629708

Theory of Games and Economic Behavior, published in 1944 by Princeton University Press, is a book by mathematician John von Neumann and economist Oskar Morgenstern which is considered the groundbreaking text that created the interdisciplinary research field of game theory. In its introduction to the 60th anniversary edition, Princeton University Press describes the book as "the classic work upon which modern-day game theory is based."

== Overview ==
The book is based partly on earlier research by von Neumann, published in 1928 under the German title "Zur Theorie der Gesellschaftsspiele" ("On the Theory of Board Games").

The derivation of expected utility from its axioms appeared in an appendix to the Second Edition (1947). Von Neumann and Morgenstern used objective probabilities, supposing that all the agents had the same probability distribution, as a convenience. However, Neumann and Morgenstern mentioned that a theory of subjective probability could be provided, and this task was completed by Jimmie Savage in 1954 and Johann Pfanzagl in 1967. Savage extended von Neumann and Morgenstern's axioms of rational preferences to endogenize probability and make it subjective. He then used Bayes' theorem to update these subject probabilities in light of new information, thus linking rational choice and inference.

The book begins with a preface. This is then followed by a chapter on the Formulation of the Economic Problem and one on a General Formal Description of Games of Strategy. Zero sum games are then introduced. Firstly with a chapter on a Theory of Zero-Sum Two-Person Games, then one on Examples, and then one on Three-Person Games Zero Sum games. A General Theory: Zero-Sum N-Person Games is offered and then a chapter on Four-Person Zero-Sum games. After these is a chapter offering Some Remarks Concerning N ≧ 5 Participants Games. Then chapters on the Composition and Decomposition of Games, one on Simple Games and one on General Non-Zero-Sum Games are provided. The final chapter is on Extensions of the Concepts of Domination and Solution. After this at the end of the book there is an appendix offering an Axiomatic Treatment of Utility.

== Reception ==
Richard Stone described the book as the most important publication in the field of economics since The General Theory of Employment, Interest and Money (1936) by John Maynard Keynes. Arthur Herbert Copeland deemed the book an importance advance in making economics an exact science. Herbert A. Simon also praised the book.

== See also ==
- Pfanzagl, J (1967). "Subjective Probability Derived from the Morgenstern-von Neumann Utility Theory". In Martin Shubik (ed.). Essays in Mathematical Economics In Honor of Oskar Morgenstern. Princeton University Press. pp. 237–251.
- Pfanzagl, J. in cooperation with V. Baumann and H. Huber (1968). "Events, Utility and Subjective Probability". Theory of Measurement. Wiley. pp. 195–220.
- Morgenstern, Oskar (1976). "Some Reflections on Utility". In Andrew Schotter (ed.). Selected Economic Writings of Oskar Morgenstern. New York University Press. pp. 65–70.
- Morgenstern Oskar (1976). "The Collaboration Between Oskar Morgenstern and John von Neumann on the Theory of Games". Journal of Economic Literature. 14 (3): 805–816. JSTOR 2722628.
- Hurwicz Leonid (1945). "The Theory of Economic Behavior". American Economic Review. 35 (5): 909–925. JSTOR 1812602.
- Kaysen Carl (1946). "A Revolution in Economic Theory?". Review of Economic Studies. 14 (1): 1–15. doi:10.2307/2295753. JSTOR 2295753.
- Marschak Jacob (1946). "Neumann's and Morgenstern's New Approach to Static Economics" (PDF). Journal of Political Economy. 54 (2): 97–115. doi:10.1086/256327. S2CID 154536775.
