= Gert Sabidussi =

Austrian mathematician (1929–2022)

Gert Sabidussi (28 October 1929 – 1 April 2022) was an Austrian mathematician specializing in combinatorics and graph theory.

== Biography ==
Sabidussi was born in Graz, Austria, on 28 October 1929. His family later moved to Innsbruck, where his father was a Protestant deacon. He graduated from the University of Vienna, where he attended lectures by Felix Ehrenhaft, Nikolaus Hofreiter, Johann Radon and Hans Thirring. In 1953, he defended his doctorate on 0–1 matrices under the supervision of Edmund Hlawka and received a two-year fellowship at Princeton University. He was then an instructor at the University of Minnesota in Minneapolis, but because of the heavy teaching load moved a year later, in 1956, to Tulane University in New Orleans. He moved to McMaster University in Hamilton, Ontario, in 1960 and afterwards to the University of Montreal in 1969. He was instrumental in bringing to Canada a number of combinatorialists and graph theorists, including Anton Kotzig and Jaroslav Nešetřil, who wrote a thesis under Sabidussi. Over the years, he had 13 graduate students. His 60th, 70th and 80th birthdays were celebrated with large graph theory birthday conferences. Sabidussi died on 1 April 2022, at the age of 92.

== Mathematical work ==
Sabidussi wrote foundational work on Cayley graphs, graph products and Frucht's theorem.

== Sources ==
- Sabidussi's Biography (in German)
