= Martin Goldstern =

Austrian mathematician (born 1963)

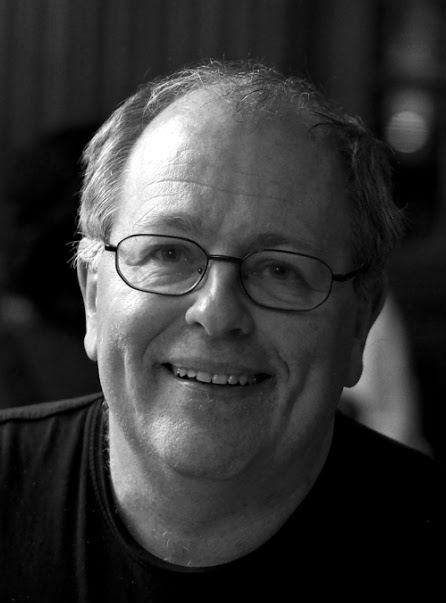
- Martin Goldstern in 2018
- Born: 7 May 1963 (age 63); Austria
- Education: TU Wien (1986), UC Berkeley (1991)
- Scientific career
- Fields: Mathematics
- Workplaces: TU Wien
- Doctoral advisors: Robert F. Tichy; Jack Silver and Haim Judah

Martin Goldstern (born 7 May 1963 in Austria) is an Austrian mathematician and university professor for set theory at the TU Wien and head of the research unit 8 of the Institute of Discrete Mathematics and Geometry. His main research lies in set theory of the real line and forcing theory, and applications of set theory in universal algebra.

He is cousin of Martin Karplus and great-nephew of Eugenie Goldstern.

== Academic career ==
Goldstern earned a Ph.D. in 1986 at the TU Wien under the direction of Robert F. Tichy, with a dissertation in equidistribution; and another in set theory in 1991 at UC Berkeley under the direction of Jack Silver and Haim Judah. As postdoc he held temporary positions at Bar Ilan University, Freie Universität Berlin and Carnegie Mellon University. He acquired habilitation at TU Wien in 1993 with the thesis Tools for your forcing construction, which greatly simplified, and made widely accessible, a general preservation theorem of Saharon Shelah for countable support proper forcing iterations. In 1993 he started working at TU Wien, where he is now full professor.

In 1996, Goldstern won the Prize of the Austrian Mathematical Society. In 2015, 2018 and 2023 he held visiting professor positions at the Hebrew University of Jerusalem. Together with Jakob Kellner and Shelah he showed the consistency (assuming large cardinals) of Cichoń's maximum, i.e., the statement that the ten "independent" entries in Cichoń's diagram are all different.

== Selected publications ==
- Goldstern, Martin (1993). "Tools for your forcing construction" (PDF). Set theory of the reals (Ramat Gan, 1991). Israel Math. Conf. Proc. Vol. 6. Bar-Ilan Univ., Ramat Gan. pp. 305–360.
- Goldstern, Martin; Pinsker, Michael (1993), "A survey of clones on infinite sets", Algebra Universalis, 59 (3–4): 365–403, arXiv:math/0407173, doi:10.1007/s00012-008-2100-2, S2CID 16450005
- Goldstern, Martin; Judah, Haim (1995). The incompleteness phenomenon. A new course in mathematical logic, With a foreword by Saharon Shelah. A K Peters, Ltd., Natick, MA. pp. xiv+247. ISBN 9781568810294. (reprinted in 1998)
- Goldstern, Martin; Kellner, Jakob; Shelah, Saharon (2019), "Cichoń's maximum", Annals of Mathematics, 190 (1): 113–143, arXiv:1708.03691, doi:10.4007/annals.2019.190.1.2, S2CID 119654292
- Goldstern, Martin; Kellner, Jakob; Mejía, Diego A.; Shelah, Saharon (2019), "Cichoń's maximum without large cardinals", Journal of the European Mathematical Society, 24 (11): 3951–3967, arXiv:1906.06608, doi:10.4171/JEMS/1178, S2CID 189928245
