= Hofreiter =

Hofreiter is a German surname. Notable people with the surname include:

- Anton Hofreiter (born 1970), German politician
- Nikolaus Hofreiter (1904–1990), Austrian mathematician
