= Klavžar (surname) =

Klavžar is a surname. Notable people with the surname include:

- Sandi Klavžar (born 1962), Slovenian mathematician
- Urban Klavžar (born 2004), Slovenian basketball player
