= Herbert Fleischner =

Austrian mathematician

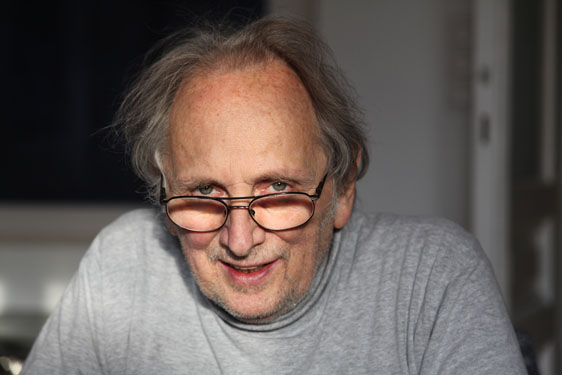
Herbert Fleischner, 2017

Herbert Fleischner (29 January 1944 – 7 October 2025) was an Austrian mathematician.

== Education and career ==
Fleischner moved to Vienna with his parents in 1946. He attended primary and secondary school in Vienna, graduating in 1962. After that he studied mathematics and physics at the University of Vienna; his main teachers were Nikolaus Hofreiter and Edmund Hlawka. He obtained his PhD degree in 1968; his official PhD supervisor was Edmund Hlawka, and his PhD thesis was entitled Sätze über Eulersche Graphen mit speziellen Eigenschaften, Sätze über die Existenz von Hamiltonschen Linien. However, Herbert Izbicki was the actual supervisor since he was a graph theorist. Fleischner started his academic career as an assistant at the Technical University of Vienna. The academic years 1970/71 and 1971/72 he spent at SUNY Binghamton as postdoctoral research associate and assistant professor; 1972/73 he spent at the Institute for Advanced Study as visiting member on the basis of an NSF grant. After that he returned to Vienna and started working at the Austrian Academy of Sciences (ÖAW), first at the Institute for Information Processing, then at the Institute of Discrete Mathematics. He worked at the ÖAW until the end of 2002, but took leave to work at Memphis State University (now Memphis University, 1977), MIT (1978, Max Kade Grant), University of Zimbabwe (Academic Staff Development Project sponsored by Österreichischer Entwicklungskooperation and UNESCO, 1997–1999), West Virginia University (2002). He also worked at Texas A&M University (SS 2003 und SS 2006).

Fleischner's research focuses mainly on graph theoretical topics such as hamiltonian and eulerian graphs. One of his main achievements is the proof of the theorem according to which the square of every two-connected graph has a Hamiltonian cycle. This result (now known as Fleischner's theorem) had been submitted in 1971 and was published in 1974.

Another milestone in his research was the solution of the "Cycle plus Triangles Problems“ posed by Paul Erdős; its solution came about in cooperation with Michael Stiebitz (TU Ilmenau).

Fleischner published more than 90 papers in various mathematical journals; his Erdős-number is 2. His friendship with the Austrian painter de:Robert Lettner resulted in a cooperation in which certain graphs were transformed into paintings called mutations.

During 2002-2007 he was Chairman of the Committee for Developing Countries of the European Mathematical Society (EMS-CDC).

== Publications ==
- Eulerian Graphs and Related Topics: Part 1, Volume 1 (= Annals of Discrete Mathematics Band 45). Elsevier, Juli 1990, ISBN 978-0-444-88395-7.
- Eulerian Graphs and Related Topics: Part 1, Volume 2 (= Annals of Discrete Mathematics Band 50). Elsevier, Juni 1991, ISBN 978-0-444-89110-5.
- Эйлеровы графы и смежные вопросы. Москва: Мир (2002), ISBN 5-03-003115-4. (Russian translation of Eulerian Graphs and Related Topics: Part 1, Volume 1)
