= Monika Ludwig =

Austrian mathematician

Monika Ludwig (born 1966 in Cologne) is an Austrian mathematician, University Professor of Convex and Discrete Geometry at the Vienna University of Technology.

== Academic career ==
Ludwig earned a Dipl.-Ing. degree from the Vienna University of Technology in 1990, and a doctorate in 1994 under the supervision of Peter M. Gruber. She remained at the same university as an assistant and associate professor from 1994 until 2007, when she moved to the Polytechnic Institute of New York University. She returned to the Vienna University of Technology as a full professor in 2010.

== Awards and honors ==
Ludwig won the Edmund and Rosa Hlawka Prize of the Austrian Academy of Sciences, given to an outstanding Austrian researcher in geometry of numbers or numerical analysis under the age of 30, in 1998. She won the Prize of the Austrian Mathematical Society in 2004.

She became a corresponding member of the Austrian Academy of Sciences in 2011, and a fellow of the American Mathematical Society in 2012. She became a full member of the Austrian Academy of Sciences in 2013.

== Notable publications ==
- Ludwig, Monika; Reitzner, Matthias (15 October 1999), "A characterization of affine surface area", Advances in Mathematics, 147 (1): 138–172, doi:10.1006/aima.1999.1832
- Ludwig, Monika (25 December 2002), "Projection bodies and valuations", Advances in Mathematics, 172 (2): 158–168, doi:10.1016/S0001-8708(02)00021-X
- Ludwig, Monika (15 July 2003), "Ellipsoids and matrix-valued valuations", Duke Mathematical Journal, 119 (1): 159–188, doi:10.1215/S0012-7094-03-11915-8
- Ludwig, Monika (2005), "Minkowski valuations", Transactions of the American Mathematical Society, 357 (10): 4191–4213, doi:10.1090/S0002-9947-04-03666-9
- Haberl, Christoph; Ludwig, Monika (2006), "A characterization of $L_p$ intersection bodies", International Mathematics Research Notices, 2006 10548, doi:10.1155/IMRN/2006/10548
- Ludwig, Monika (2006), "Intersection bodies and valuations", American Journal of Mathematics, 128 (6): 1409–1428, doi:10.1353/ajm.2006.0046, JSTOR 40068039, S2CID 11303696
- Ludwig, Monika (20 August 2010), "General affine surface areas", Advances in Mathematics, 224 (6): 2346–2360, arXiv:0908.2191, doi:10.1016/j.aim.2010.02.004
- Ludwig, Monika; Reitzner, Matthias (2010), "A classification of $SL(n)$ invariant valuations", Annals of Mathematics, Second series, 172 (2): 1219–1267, doi:10.4007/annals.2010.172.1219, JSTOR 29764637
