= Genus field =

Maximal abelian extension of an algebraic number field

In algebraic number theory, the genus field $\Gamma(K)$ of an algebraic number field $K$ is the maximal abelian extension of $K$ which is obtained by composing an absolutely abelian field with $K$ and which is unramified at all finite primes of $K$. The genus number of $K$ is the degree $[\Gamma(K):K]$ and the genus group is the Galois group of $\Gamma(K)$ over $K$.

If $K$ is itself absolutely abelian, the genus field may be described as the maximal absolutely abelian extension of $K$ unramified at all finite primes: this definition was used by Leopoldt and Hasse.

If $K=\Q(\sqrt{m})$ ($m$ square-free) is a quadratic field of discriminant $D$, the genus field of $K$ is a composite of quadratic fields. Let p_{i} run over the prime factors of $D$. For each such prime p, define p^{∗} as follows:

$$p^* = \pm p \equiv 1 \pmod 4 \text{ if } p \text{ is odd} ;$$
$$2^* = -4, 8, -8 \text{ according as } m \equiv 3 \pmod 4, 2 \pmod 8, -2 \pmod 8 .$$

Then the genus field is the composite $K(\sqrt{p_i^*}).$

== See also ==
- Hilbert class field
