= Johann Pfanzagl =

Austrian mathematician (1928–2019)

- Born: 2 July 1928; Vienna, Austria
- Died: June 4, 2019 (aged 90)
- Education: University of Vienna
- Scientific career
- Fields: mathematical statistics
- Workplaces: Austrian Federal Economic Chamber; University of Cologne
- Doctoral advisor: Edmund Hlawka
- Other academic advisors: Johann Radon
- Doctoral students: Friedrich Götze

Johann Richard Pfanzagl (2 July 1928 – 4 June 2019) was an Austrian mathematician known for his research in mathematical statistics.

== Life and career ==
Pfanzagl studied from 1946 to 1951 at the University of Vienna and received his doctorate there in 1951 with Johann Radon and Edmund Hlawka on the topic of Hermitian forms in imaginary square number fields. In the same year he became a founding member of the Austrian Statistical Society, of which he was executive secretary from 1955 to 1959. From 1951 to 1959, Pfanzagl headed the statistical office of the Austrian Federal Economic Chamber. In 1959 he habilitated as a professor for statistics at the University of Vienna. Since 1960 he was a member of the Austrian Mathematical Society. At the same year, he moved to the University of Cologne, where he has held two chairs, one after the other, from 1960 to 1964 for economic and social statistics and from 1964 until his retirement in 1995 for mathematical statistics.

Pfanzagl became an honorary member of the Institute of Mathematical Statistics in 1968. From 1993 he was a corresponding member of the mathematics and natural sciences class abroad at the Austrian Academy of Sciences and received an honorary doctorate from the Vienna University of Economics and Business in 1993. He became an honorary member of the Austrian Statistical Society in 1996.

== Bibliography ==
- Pfanzagl, Johann (2017). Mathematical Statistics. Springer Series in Statistics. Berlin, Heidelberg: Springer Berlin Heidelberg. doi:10.1007/978-3-642-31084-3. ISBN 978-3-642-31083-6.
- —— (3 May 2011). Parametric Statistical Theory. De Gruyter. doi:10.1515/9783110889765. ISBN 978-3-11-088976-5.
- —— (1 March 2011). Elementare Wahrscheinlichkeitsrechnung (in German). De Gruyter. doi:10.1515/9783110869217. ISBN 978-3-11-086921-7.
- —— (1990). Estimation in Semiparametric Models. Lecture Notes in Statistics. Vol. 63. New York, NY: Springer US. doi:10.1007/978-1-4612-3396-1. ISBN 978-0-387-97238-1.
- —— (1985). Asymptotic Expansions for General Statistical Models. Lecture Notes in Statistics. Vol. 31. New York, NY: Springer New York. doi:10.1007/978-1-4615-6479-9. ISBN 978-0-387-96221-4.
- —— (1982). Contributions to a General Asymptotic Statistical Theory. Lecture Notes in Statistics. Vol. 13. New York, NY: Springer New York. doi:10.1007/978-1-4612-5769-1. ISBN 978-0-387-90776-5.
- —— (1972). Band 1 Elementare Methoden unter besonderer Berücksichtigung der Anwendungen in den Wirtschafts- und Sozialwissenschaften (in German). De Gruyter. doi:10.1515/9783111683171. ISBN 978-3-11-168317-1.
- —— (1974). Band 2 Höhere Methoden unter besonderer Berücksichtigung der Anwendungen in Naturwissenschaften, Medizin und Technik (in German). De Gruyter. doi:10.1515/9783110827804. ISBN 978-3-11-082780-4.
- ——; Baumann, V.; Huber, H. (1971). Theory of Measurement. Heidelberg: Physica-Verlag HD. doi:10.1007/978-3-662-41488-0. ISBN 978-3-7908-0016-6.
- ——; Pierlo, W. (1966). Compact Systems of Sets. Lecture Notes in Mathematics. Vol. 16. Berlin, Heidelberg: Springer Berlin Heidelberg. doi:10.1007/bfb0078990. ISBN 978-3-540-03599-2.
- Die axiomatischen Grundlagen einer allgemeinen Theorie des Messens. Schriftenreihe des Statistischen Instituts der Universität Wien N. F. Nr. 1, Physica-Verlag, 1959.
