= Philipp Furtwängler =

German mathematician (1869–1940)

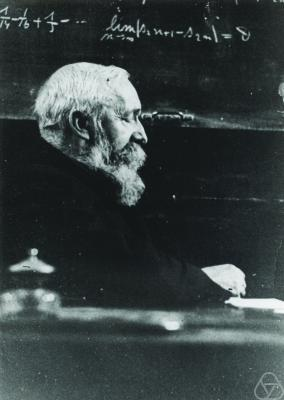
- Born: April 21, 1869; Elze, North German Confederation
- Died: May 19, 1940 (aged 71); Vienna, Austria
- Occupation: Mathematician
- Known for: Principal ideal theorem
- Scientific career
- Doctoral advisor: Felix Klein
- Doctoral students: Wolfgang Gröbner, Nikolaus Hofreiter, Henry Mann, Otto Schreier, Olga Taussky-Todd

Friederich Pius Philipp Furtwängler (April 21, 1869 – May 19, 1940) was a German number theorist.

== Biography ==
Furtwängler wrote an 1896 doctoral dissertation at the University of Göttingen on cubic forms (Zur Theorie der in Linearfaktoren zerlegbaren ganzzahligen ternären kubischen Formen), under Felix Klein. Most of his academic life, from 1912 to 1938, was spent at the University of Vienna, where he taught for example Kurt Gödel, who later said that Furtwängler's lectures on number theory were the best mathematical lectures that he ever heard; Gödel had originally intended to become a physicist but turned to mathematics partly as a result of Furtwängler's lectures. From 1916, Furtwängler became increasingly paralysed and, without notes, lectured from a wheelchair while his assistant wrote equations on the blackboard.

Some of Furtwängler's doctoral students were Wolfgang Gröbner, Nikolaus Hofreiter, Henry Mann, Otto Schreier, and Olga Taussky-Todd. Through these and others, he has over 3000 academic descendants.

He is now best known for his contribution to the principal ideal theorem in the form of his Beweis des Hauptidealsatzes für Klassenkörper algebraischer Zahlkörper (1929).

Philipp Furtwängler was a grandson of the organ builder Philipp Furtwängler (1800-1867) and a second cousin of the conductor Wilhelm Furtwängler.

== Selected publications ==
- with Helmut Hasse and W. Jehne: Allgemeine Theorie der algebraischen Zahlen. Vol. 8. Teubner, 1953.

== See also ==
- Eisenstein reciprocity
- Hilbert class field
- Keller's conjecture
- Kummer–Vandiver conjecture
- Principalization (algebra)

== Sources ==
- "Philipp Furtwängler". In: Österreichisches Biographisches Lexikon 1815–1950 (ÖBL). Vol. 1, Austrian Academy of Sciences, Vienna 1957, p. 383.
- Nikolaus Hofreiter (1961). "Furtwängler, Friedrich Pius Philipp". Neue Deutsche Biographie (in German). Vol. 5. Berlin: Duncker & Humblot. pp. 740–740.
