= Friedrich Götze =

German mathematician (born 1951)

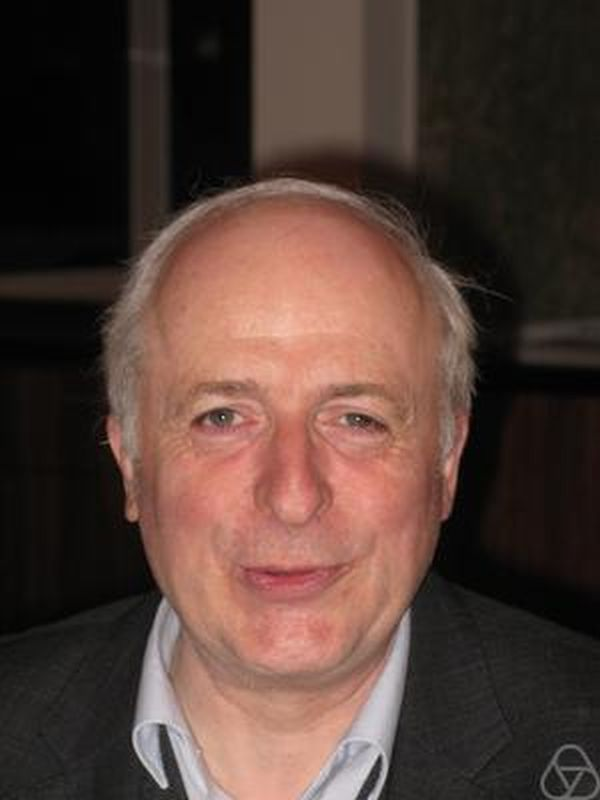
- Born: August 6, 1951 (age 75); Hameln, Germany
- Education: University of Göttingen; University of Bonn; University of Cologne
- Scientific career
- Workplaces: University of Cologne; Bielefeld University
- Doctoral advisor: Johann Pfanzagl

Friedrich Götze (born 6 August 1951 in Hameln) is a German mathematician, specializing in probability theory, mathematical statistics, and number theory.

== Education and career ==
Götze studied mathematics and physics at the University of Göttingen and the University of Bonn by means of a scholarship from the Studienstiftung des deutschen Volkes. In 1978 he received his doctorate from the University of Cologne with thesis Asymptotic Expansions in the Central Limit Theorem in Banach Spaces under the supervision of Johann Pfanzagl. At the University of Cologne, Götze was an assistant, interrupted by a year as visiting professor at the University of California, Berkeley. In 1983 he habilitated in Cologne with thesis Asymptotic developments in central limit theorems. In 1984 he became a professor of mathematics at Bielefeld University. For the academic years 1990/91 and 2002/2003 he was Dean of the Faculty of Mathematics.

Götze is a member of the scientific advisory board of the Weierstrass Institute (of which he is a founding member) and of the board of the Gesellschaft für Mathematische Forschung, which supports and legally represents the Mathematisches Forschungsinstitut Oberwolfach. He is a Fellow of the University of Göttingen's Institute for Mathematical Stochastics. He was in 2017/18 the vice-president and was elected for 2019/20 the president of the Deutsche Mathematiker-Vereinigung (DMV).

== Research ==
His research deals with asymptotic methods, convergence rates and limit theorems in mathematical statistics, Markov processes, stochastic algorithms, probability theory, functional analysis, and spectral distribution in random matrices. He applied probabilistic methods to analytic number theory and the geometry of numbers, including the problem of distribution and density of lattice points in ellipses. With the introduction of fundamental new methods, he gave a new, effective proof of the Oppenheim conjecture, which was first proved by Grigory Margulis in 1987. Götze was the spokesperson for the DFG Collaborative Research Center's Spektrale Strukturen und Topologische Methoden in der Mathematik (Spectral Structures and Topological Methods in Mathematics).

== Honors and awards ==
Götze was an Invited Speaker at the International Congress of Mathematicians in Berlin in 1988. In 2009 he became a member of the Leopoldina. In 2012 he was the Gauss Lecturer with talk Der mehrdimensionale zentrale Grenzwertsatz und die Geometrie der Zahlen (The multidimensional central limit theorem and the geometry of numbers). For his contribution to the establishment of the European Institute for Statistics, Probability, Stochastic Operations Research and its Applications (Eurandom), he was awarded the Order of Orange-Nassau in 2014.
