= Frucht graph =

Cubic graph with 12 vertices and 18 edges

- The Frucht graph
- Named after: Robert Frucht
- Vertices: 12
- Edges: 18
- Radius: 3
- Diameter: 4
- Girth: 3
- Automorphisms: identity
- Chromatic number: 3
- Chromatic index: 3
- Properties: Cubic; Halin; Pancyclic

In graph theory, the Frucht graph is a cubic graph with 12 vertices, 18 edges, and no nontrivial symmetries. It was first described by Robert Frucht in 1949.

The Frucht graph can be constructed from the LCF notation: [−5,−2,−4,2,5,−2,2,5,−2,−5,4,2]. This describes it as a cubic graph in which two of the three adjacencies of each vertex form part of a Hamiltonian cycle and the numbers specify how far along the cycle to find the third neighbor of each vertex.

== Properties ==
The Frucht graph is a cubic graph, because three vertices are incident to every vertex, thereby the degree of every vertex is 3. It is one of the five smallest cubic graphs possessing only a single graph automorphism, the identity: every vertex can be distinguished topologically from every other vertex. Such graphs are called asymmetric (or identity) graphs. Frucht's theorem states that any finite group can be realized as the group of symmetries of a graph, and a strengthening of this theorem, also due to Frucht, states that any finite group can be realized as the symmetries of a 3-regular graph. The Frucht graph provides an example of this strengthened realization for the trivial group.

Frucht graph as a convex polyhedron

The Frucht graph is a Halin graph, a type of planar graph formed from a tree with no degree-two vertices by adding a cycle connecting its leaves. Every Halin graph is 3-vertex-connected: deleting two of its vertices cannot disconnect it. By Steinitz's theorem, the Frucht graph is hence polyhedral, meaning its 12 vertices and 18 edges form the skeleton of a convex polyhedron. It is also Hamiltonian.

It is pancyclic, with chromatic number 3, chromatic index 3, radius 3, and diameter 4. Its girth 3. Its independence number is 5.

The characteristic polynomial of the Frucht graph is $(x-3) (x-2) x (x+1) (x+2) (x^3+x^2-2 x-1) (x^4+x^3-6 x^2-5 x+4)$.

== Gallery ==
The chromatic number of the Frucht graph is 3.

The Frucht graph is Hamiltonian.
