= Gerrit Lekkerkerker =

Dutch mathematician (1922–1999)

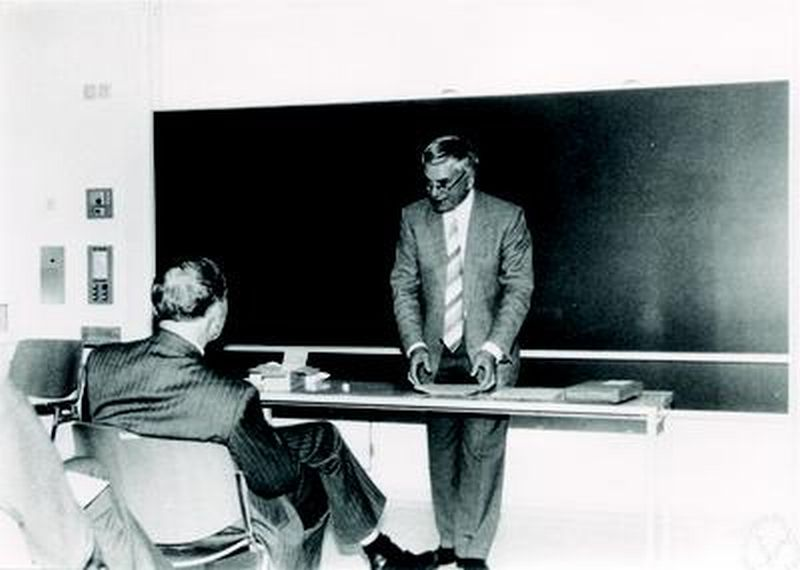
Gerrit Lekkerkerker in Vienna, 1987

Cornelis Gerrit Lekkerkerker (Harmelen, 7 February 1922 – 24 July 1999) was a Dutch mathematician.

== Education and career ==
Lekkerkerker studied mathematics at Utrecht University during the periods 1940-1943 and 1945-1949 under Jurjen Koksma and Jan Popken. After completing his studies in 1949, he started work at the Amsterdam Centrum Wiskunde & Informatica (National Research Institute for Mathematics and Computer Science), where he worked under Koksma in the pure mathematics division. In the academic year 1953-1954, he studied in Rome. In 1955 he received his doctorate under the guidance of Popken with the thesis On the Zeros of a Class of Dirichlet-Series; in Dutch: Over de nulpunten in een klasse van Dirichletreeksen.

Beginning in 1961, he was a professor at the University of Amsterdam, succeeding Nicolaas Govert de Bruijn. He was the director of the Mathematical Institute during the student protests of 1969-1973. In 1984, although he had not yet reached retirement age, he resigned his professorship over differences in the teaching of mathematical analysis, feeling that his academic freedom was under threat.

He was a co-editor of Mededelingen van het Wiskundig Genootschap (correspondence of the Mathematical Society).

== Research ==
Lekkerkerker worked on analytic and geometric number theory. He wrote the standard work Geometry of Numbers, first published in 1969. Later he worked on topics in functional analysis. In the 1970s, he turned his attention towards the mathematical treatment of topics in nuclear physics (e.g. neutron transport) and astrophysics (e.g. radiation transport within stars). Afterwards he worked with Rutger Hangelbroek, who did his doctorate under Lekkerkerker in 1973 at the University of Groningen, and Hans Kaper of the Argonne National Laboratory. He also contributed to topics in graph theory and topology.

After retiring, he remained active in mathematics: for example, he brought out a second edition of Geometry of Numbers along with Peter Grüber. This field now found new applications in coding theory.

While Zeckendorf's theorem on the representation of integers by sums of non-consecutive Fibonacci numbers is named after a paper by Edouard Zeckendorf in 1972, the same result had been published 20 years earlier by Lekkerkerker.

== Works ==
- 1969: Geometry of Numbers, Noord-Holland, 2nd edition 1987 with Peter M. Gruber, 2008 translated to Russian, Nauka, Moscow
- 1982: with Hans G. Kaper and J. Hejtmanek, Spectral Methods in Linear Transport Theory, Birkhäuser
