= Alekseev–Gröbner formula =

Formula for expressing the global error of a perturbation

The Alekseev–Gröbner formula, or nonlinear variation-of-constants formula, is a generalization of the linear variation of constants formula which was proven independently by Wolfgang Gröbner in 1960 and Vladimir Mikhailovich Alekseev in 1961. It expresses the global error of a perturbation in terms of the local error and has many applications for studying perturbations of ordinary differential equations.

== Formulation ==
Let $d \in \mathbb N$ be a natural number, let $T \in (0, \infty)$ be a positive real number, and let $\mu \colon [0, T] \times \mathbb{R}^{d} \to \mathbb{R}^{d} \in C^{0, 1}([0, T] \times \mathbb{R}^{d})$ be a function which is continuous on the time interval $[0, T]$ and continuously differentiable on the $d$-dimensional space $\mathbb{R}^{d}$. Let $X \colon [0, T]^{2} \times \mathbb{R}^{d} \to \mathbb{R}^{d}$, $(s, t, x) \mapsto X_{s, t}^{x}$ be a continuous solution of the integral equation
$$X_{s, t}^{x} = x + \int_{s}^{t} \mu(r, X_{s, r}^{x}) dr.$$
Furthermore, let $Y \in C^{1}([0, T], \mathbb{R}^{d})$ be continuously differentiable. We view $Y$ as the unperturbed function, and $X$ as the perturbed function. Then it holds that
$$X_{0, T}^{Y_{0}} - Y_{T} = \int_{0}^{T} \left( \frac{\partial}{\partial x} X_{r, T}^{Y_{s}} \right) \left( \mu(r, Y_{r}) - \frac{d}{dr} Y_{r} \right) dr.$$
The Alekseev–Gröbner formula allows to express the global error $X_{0, T}^{Y_{0}} - Y_{T}$ in terms of the local error $( \mu(r, Y_{r}) - \tfrac{d}{dr} Y_{r})$.

== The Itô–Alekseev–Gröbner formula ==
The Itô–Alekseev–Gröbner formula is a generalization of the Alekseev–Gröbner formula which states in the deterministic case, that for a continuously differentiable function $f \in C^{1}(\mathbb R^{k}, \mathbb R^{d})$ it holds that
$$f(X_{0, T}^{Y_{0}}) - f(Y_{T}) =
\int_{0}^{T} f'\left( \frac{\partial}{\partial x} X_{r, T}^{Y_{s}} \right) \frac{\partial}{\partial x} X_{s, T}^{Y_{s}}\left( \mu(r, Y_{r}) - \frac{d}{dr} Y_{r} \right) dr.$$
