= Michael D. Plummer =

American mathematician

Michael David Plummer (born 1937) is a retired mathematics professor from Vanderbilt University. His field of work is in graph theory in which he has produced over a hundred papers and publications. He has also spoken at over a hundred and fifty guest lectures around the world.

== Education and career ==
Plummer was born in Akron, Ohio on August 31, 1937. He grew up in Lima, Ohio where he attended Lima Central High School, graduating in 1955. He then went to Wabash College in Crawfordsville, Indiana on an honor scholarship, with a double major in mathematics and physics. He then took a graduate fellowship in physics at the University of Michigan, but after one year of the program, switched to mathematics; in 1966 he was awarded his Ph.D., with a thesis supervised by Frank Harary.

After postdoctoral studies at Yale University from 1966 to 1968, Plummer took an assistant professorship in the recently formed Department of Computer Science at City College of New York which was part of the School of Engineering.

In 1970 he joined the Department of Mathematics at Vanderbilt University, and remained there until his retirement in 2008.

== Contributions ==
Among his other contributions to graph theory, Plummer is responsible for defining well-covered graphs, for making with László Lovász the now-proven conjecture (generalizing Petersen's theorem) that every bridgeless cubic graph has an exponential number of perfect matchings, and for being one of several mathematicians to conjecture the result now known as Fleischner's theorem on Hamiltonian cycles in squares of graphs.

== Awards and honors ==
Plummer is a Foundation Fellow of the Institute of Combinatorics and its Applications. In 1991, he shared the Niveau Prize of the Publishing House of the Hungarian Academy of Sciences with László Lovász for their book, Matching Theory.

== Selected publications ==
Research papers

- Plummer, Michael D. (1970), "Some covering concepts in graphs", Journal of Combinatorial Theory, 8: 91–98, doi:10.1016/S0021-9800(70)80011-4, MR 0289347.
- Plummer, M. D. (1980), "On n-extendable graphs", Discrete Mathematics, 31 (2): 201–210, doi:10.1016/0012-365X(80)90037-0, MR 0583220.

Books

- Lovász, László; Plummer, M. D. (1986), Matching Theory, Annals of Discrete Mathematics, vol. 29, North-Holland, ISBN 0-444-87916-1, MR 0859549
