= Panconnectivity =

Graph with all path lengths between each two vertices

Each possible pair of vertices $s$ and $t$ have paths of length 1 through $n-1$, where $n$ is the number of vertices. Thus, the graph shown is panconnected.

In graph theory, a panconnected graph is an undirected graph in which, for every two vertices s and t, there exist paths from s to t of every possible length from the distance d(s,t) up to n − 1, where n is the number of vertices in the graph. The concept of panconnectivity was introduced in 1975 by Yousef Alavi and James E. Williamson.

Panconnected graphs are necessarily pancyclic: if uv is an edge, then it belongs to a cycle of every possible length, and therefore the graph contains a cycle of every possible length. Panconnected graphs are also a generalization of Hamiltonian-connected graphs (graphs that have a Hamiltonian path connecting every pair of vertices).

Several classes of graphs are known to be panconnected:

- If G has a Hamiltonian cycle, then the square of G (the graph on the same vertex set that has an edge between every two vertices whose distance in G is at most two) is panconnected.
- If G is any connected graph, then the cube of G (the graph on the same vertex set that has an edge between every two vertices whose distance in G is at most three) is panconnected.
- If every vertex in an n-vertex graph has degree at least n/2 + 1, then the graph is panconnected.
- If an n-vertex graph has at least (n − 1)(n − 2)/2 + 3 edges, then the graph is panconnected.

== Related concepts ==
Vertex-pancyclic graphs: A graph of order n is vertex-pancyclic if every vertex lies on cycles of every possible length from the graph's girth up to n. While vertex-pancyclic graphs need not be panconnected, they share the property of having rich cycle structures.

Hamilton-connected graphs: These are graphs where every pair of vertices is connected by a Hamiltonian path. All panconnected graphs are Hamilton-connected, but the converse is not true. For example, the L(n) graphs (line graphs of certain inclusion graphs) are Hamilton-connected for n ≥ 4 but not panconnected.
