= Principal ideal theorem =

Theorem in class field theory on mappings induced by extending ideals

In mathematics, the principal ideal theorem of class field theory, a branch of algebraic number theory, says that extending ideals gives a mapping on the class group of an algebraic number field to the class group of its Hilbert class field, which sends all ideal classes to the class of a principal ideal. The phenomenon has also been called principalization, or sometimes capitulation.

== Formal statement ==
For any algebraic number field K and any ideal I of the ring of integers of K, if L is the Hilbert class field of K, then

$$IO_L\$$

is a principal ideal αO_{L}, for O_{L} the ring of integers of L and some element α in it.

== History ==
The principal ideal theorem was conjectured by David Hilbert (1902), and was the last remaining aspect of his program on class fields to be completed, in 1929.

Emil Artin (1927, 1929) reduced the principal ideal theorem to a question about finite abelian groups: he showed that it would follow if the transfer from a finite group to its derived subgroup is trivial. This result was proved by Philipp Furtwängler (1929).
