= Robert Frucht =

German-Chilean mathematician

Robert Wertheimer Frucht (later known as Roberto Frucht) (9 August 1906 – 26 June 1997) was a German-Chilean mathematician; his research specialty was graph theory and the symmetries of graphs.

== Education and career ==
In 1908, Frucht's family moved from Brünn, Austria-Hungary (now in the Czech Republic), where he was born, to Berlin. Frucht entered the University of Berlin in 1924 with an interest in differential geometry, but switched to group theory under the influence of his doctoral advisor, Issai Schur; he received his Ph.D. in 1931.

Unable to find academic employment in Germany due to his Jewish descent, he became an actuary in Trieste, but left Italy in 1938 because of the racial laws that came into effect at that time. He moved to Argentina, where relatives of his wife lived, and attempted to move from there to the United States, but his employment outside academia prevented him from obtaining the necessary visa. At the same time Robert Breusch, another German mathematician who had been working in Chile for three years but was leaving for the U.S., invited Frucht to fill his position at Federico Santa María Technical University in Valparaíso, Chile, where Frucht found an academic home beginning in 1939.

At Santa María, Frucht became dean of the faculty of mathematics and physics from 1948 to 1968, and retired to become an emeritus professor in 1970.

== Contributions ==
The Frucht graph.

Frucht is known for Frucht's theorem, the result that every group can be realized as the group of symmetries of an undirected graph,^{[A]}^{[B]} and for the Frucht graph, one of the five smallest cubic graphs without any nontrivial symmetries. LCF notation, a method for describing cubic Hamiltonian graphs, was named for the initials of Joshua Lederberg, H. S. M. Coxeter, and Frucht, its key developers.^{[E]}

With Coxeter and David L. Powers, Frucht was coauthor of a book on zero-symmetric graphs, the cubic graphs that have exactly one symmetry taking each vertex to each other vertex.^{[F]}

== Recognition ==
Frucht was elected to the Chilean Academy of Sciences as a corresponding member in 1979. A special issue of the Journal of Graph Theory was published in Frucht's honor in 1982, and the first three issues (1988-89) of the journal Scientia, Series A: Mathematical Sciences (the journal of the mathematics department of Federico Santa María Technical University) were published in honor of his 80th birthday.

== Selected publications ==
A.	Frucht, R. (1939), "Herstellung von Graphen mit vorgegebener abstrakter Gruppe", Compositio Mathematica (in German), 6: 239–250, Zbl 0020.07804

B.	Frucht, Robert (1949), "Graphs of degree three with a given abstract group", Canadian Journal of Mathematics, 1 (4): 365–378, doi:10.4153/cjm-1949-033-6, MR 0032987, S2CID 124723321

C.	Frucht, Roberto; Harary, Frank (1970), "On the corona of two graphs", Aequationes Mathematicae, 4 (3): 322–325, doi:10.1007/BF01844162, hdl:2027.42/44326, MR 0281659, S2CID 30756732

D.	Frucht, Roberto; Graver, Jack E.; Watkins, Mark E. (1971), "The groups of the generalized Petersen graphs", Mathematical Proceedings of the Cambridge Philosophical Society, 70 (2): 211–218, Bibcode:1971PCPS...70..211F, doi:10.1017/s0305004100049811, MR 0289365, S2CID 122686848

E.	Frucht, Roberto (1977), "A canonical representation of trivalent Hamiltonian graphs", Journal of Graph Theory, 1 (1): 45–60, doi:10.1002/jgt.3190010111, MR 0463029

F.	Coxeter, Harold Scott MacDonald; Frucht, Roberto; Powers, David L. (1981), Zero-symmetric graphs: Trivalent graphical regular representations of groups, Academic Press, ISBN 0-12-194580-4, MR 0658666
