= Transfer (group theory) =

In the mathematical field of group theory, the transfer defines, given a group G and a subgroup H of finite index, a group homomorphism from G to the abelianization of H. It can be used in conjunction with the Sylow theorems to obtain certain numerical results on the existence of finite simple groups.

The transfer was defined by Issai Schur (1902) and rediscovered by Emil Artin (1929).

== Construction ==
The construction of the map proceeds as follows: Let [G:H] = n and select coset representatives, say

$$x_1, \dots, x_n,\,$$

for H in G, so G can be written as a disjoint union

$$G = \bigcup\ x_i H.$$

Given y in G, each yx_{i} is in some coset x_{j}H and so

$$yx_i = x_jh_i$$

for some index j and some element h_{i} of H. The value of the transfer for y is defined to be the image of the product

$$\textstyle \prod_{i=1}^n h_i$$

in H/H′, where H′ is the commutator subgroup of H. The order of the factors is irrelevant since H/H′ is abelian.

It is straightforward to show that, though the individual h_{i} depends on the choice of coset representatives, the value of the transfer does not. It is also straightforward to show that the mapping defined this way is a homomorphism.

== Example ==
If G is cyclic then the transfer takes any element y of G to y^{[G:H]}.

A simple case is that seen in the Gauss lemma on quadratic residues, which in effect computes the transfer for the multiplicative group of non-zero residue classes modulo a prime number p, with respect to the subgroup {1, −1}. One advantage of looking at it that way is the ease with which the correct generalisation can be found, for example for cubic residues in the case that p − 1 is divisible by three.

== Homological interpretation ==
This homomorphism may be set in the context of group homology. In general, given any subgroup H of G and any G-module A, there is a corestriction map of homology groups $\mathrm{Cor} : H_n(H,A) \to H_n(G,A)$ induced by the inclusion map $i: H \to G$, but if we have that H is of finite index in G, there are also restriction maps $\mathrm{Res} : H_n(G,A) \to H_n(H,A)$. In the case of n = 1 and $A=\mathbb{Z}$ with the trivial G-module structure, we have the map $\mathrm{Res} : H_1(G,\mathbb{Z}) \to H_1(H,\mathbb{Z})$. Noting that $H_1(G,\mathbb{Z})$ may be identified with $G/G'$ where $G'$ is the commutator subgroup, this gives the transfer map via $G \xrightarrow{\pi} G/G' \xrightarrow{\mathrm{Res}} H/H'$, with $\pi$ denoting the natural projection. The transfer is also seen in algebraic topology, when it is defined between classifying spaces of groups.

== Terminology ==
The name transfer translates the German Verlagerung, which was coined by Helmut Hasse.

== Commutator subgroup ==
If G is finitely generated, the commutator subgroup G′ of G has finite index in G and H=G′, then the corresponding transfer map is trivial. In other words, the map sends G to 0 in the abelianization of G′. This is important in proving the principal ideal theorem in class field theory. See the Emil Artin-John Tate Class Field Theory notes.

== See also ==
- Focal subgroup theorem, an important application of transfer
- By Artin's reciprocity law, the Artin transfer describes the principalization of ideal classes in extensions of algebraic number fields.
