= Wilfried Imrich =

Austrian mathematician (born 1941)

Wilfried Imrich (born 25 May 1941) is an Austrian mathematician working mainly in graph theory. He is known for his work on graph products, and authored the books Product Graphs: Structure and Recognition (Wiley, 2000, with Sandi Klavžar), Topics in graph theory: Graphs and their Cartesian Products (AK Peters, 2008, with Klavžar and Douglas F. Rall), and Handbook of Product Graphs (2nd ed., CRC, 2011, with Klavžar and Richard Hammack).

Imrich earned his doctorate from the University of Vienna in 1965, under the joint supervision of Nikolaus Hofreiter and Edmund Hlawka. He has worked as a researcher for IBM in Vienna, as an assistant professor at TU Wien and the University at Albany, SUNY, as a postdoctoral researcher at Lomonosov University, and, since 1973, as a full professor at the University of Leoben in Austria. He retired in 2009, becoming a professor emeritus at Leoben. He is on board of advisors of the journal Ars Mathematica Contemporanea. Since 2012 he has been a member of the Academia Europaea.
