= Robert Breusch =

American mathematician

Robert Hermann Breusch (April 2, 1907 – March 29, 1995) was an American number theorist, the William J. Walker Professor of Mathematics at Amherst College.

Breusch was born in Freiburg, Germany, and studied mathematics both at the University of Freiburg and the University of Berlin. Unable to secure a university position after receiving his doctorate, Breusch became a schoolteacher near Freiburg, where he met his future wife, Kate Dreyfuss; Breusch was Protestant, but Dreyfuss was Jewish, and the two of them left Nazi Germany for Chile in the mid-1930s. They married there, and Breusch found a faculty position at Federico Santa María Technical University in Valparaíso. In 1939, they left Chile for the United States, inviting Robert Frucht to take Breusch's place at Santa María; after some years working again as a schoolteacher, Breusch found a position at Amherst College in 1943. He became the Walker professor in 1970, and retired to become an emeritus professor in 1973. The Robert H. Breusch Prize in Mathematics, for the best senior thesis from an Amherst student, was endowed in his memory.

As a mathematician, Breusch was known for his new proof of the prime number theorem and for the many solutions he provided to problems posed in the American Mathematical Monthly. His thesis work combined Bertrand's postulate with Dirichlet's theorem on arithmetic progressions by showing that each of the progressions 3i + 1, 3i + 2, 4i + 1, and 4i + 3 (for i = 0, 1, 2, ...) contains a prime number between x and 2x for every x ≥ 7. For instance, he proved that for n > 47 there is at least one prime between n and (9/8)n. He also wrote a calculus textbook, Calculus and Analytic Geometry with Applications (Prindle, Weber & Schmidt, 1969) with C. Stanley Ogilvy.

== See also ==
- Fermat's Last Theorem
- Odd greedy expansion
