= Rudolf Inzinger =

Austrian mathematician

Rudolf Inzinger (5 April 1907 – 26 August 1980) was an Austrian mathematician who made contributions to differential geometry, the theory of convex bodies, and inverse problems for sound waves.

== Biography ==
Born in Vienna, he was a student at the Technische Hochschule in the same city. In 1933 he defended his PhD Die Liesche Abbildung and in 1936 he received his habilitation. After the Anschluss he had to leave. After his return from war captivity he started again working at the Technische Hochschule in Vienna in 1945 where he was appointed associated professor in 1946 and promoted to full professor one year later.

In 1946 he reestablished the Austrian Mathematical Society whose president he was until 1948. In 1968/69 he served as president of the Technische Hochschule in Vienna.
