= Leopold Schmetterer =

Austrian mathematician

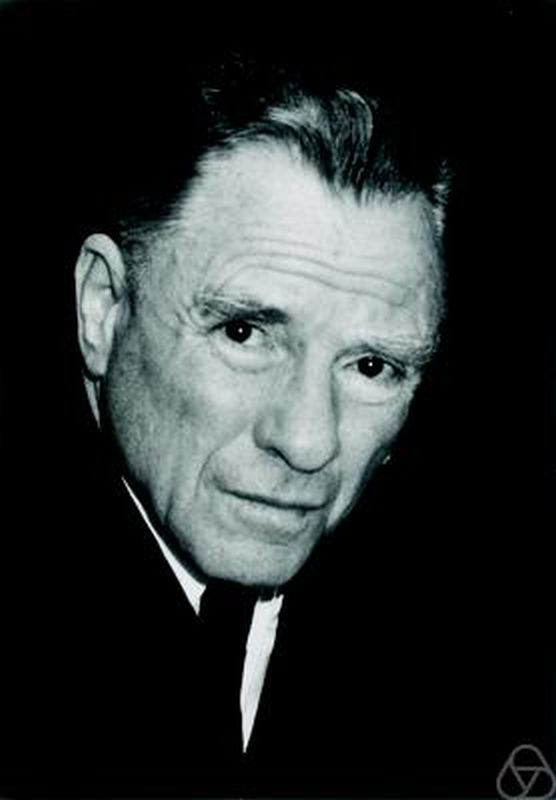
- Born: 8 November 1919; Vienna, Austria
- Died: 23 August 2004 (aged 84)
- Occupation: Mathematician
- Scientific career
- Doctoral advisor: Nikolaus Hofreiter

Leopold Karl Schmetterer (8 November 1919 in Vienna – 23 August 2004 in Gols) was an Austrian mathematician working on analysis, probability, and statistics.

== Decorations and awards ==
- 1973: Fellow of the American Statistical Association
- 1975: Austrian Cross of Honour for Science and Art, 1st class
- 1976: Science Award of the City of Vienna
- 1981: Austrian State Prize for Science Policy (Ludwig Boltzmann Prize)
- 1984: Erwin Schrödinger Prize of the Austrian Academy of Sciences
- 1969: Gibble award
