= Wolfgang Gröbner =

Austrian mathematician

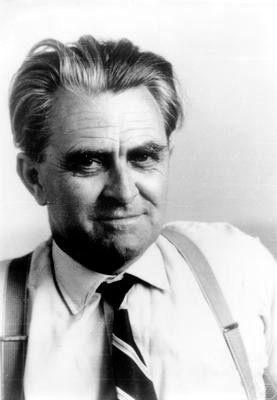
- Wolfgang Gröbner
- Born: 11 February 1899; Gossensaß, Tyrol, Austria-Hungary
- Died: 20 August 1980 (aged 81)
- Education: University of Vienna
- Awards: Wilhelm Exner Medal (1969)
- Scientific career
- Fields: Mathematics
- Workplaces: University of Innsbruck
- Doctoral advisor: Philipp Furtwängler
- Doctoral students: Bruno Buchberger; Gerhard Wanner

Wolfgang Gröbner (11 February 1899 – 20 August 1980) was an Austrian mathematician. His name is best known for the Gröbner basis, used for computations in algebraic geometry. However, the theory of Gröbner bases for polynomial rings was developed by his student Bruno Buchberger in 1965, who named them for Gröbner. Gröbner is also known for the Alekseev-Gröbner formula, which was actually proven by him.

== Early life ==
Gröbner was born in Gossensaß, which at that time was in part of the County of Tyrol of the Austro-Hungarian Empire and is now part of Italy.

Gröbner first studied engineering at the University of Technology in Graz, Austria, but switched to mathematics in 1929.

== Career ==
He wrote his dissertation Ein Beitrag zum Problem der Minimalbasen in 1932 at the University of Vienna; his advisor was Philipp Furtwängler. After his promotion, he did further studies at the University of Göttingen under Emmy Noether, in what is now known as commutative algebra. Later he contributed with his students to numerical analysis of ordinary differential equations and the industrial applications of Lie-theoretic methods, including a book on Lie series.

== Awards ==
- Wilhelm Exner Medal, 1969.
