= Edmund Hlawka =

Austrian mathematician

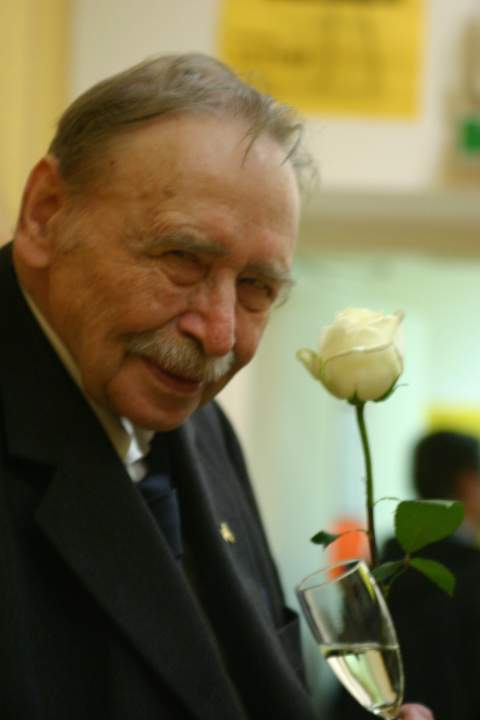
- Born: 5 November 1916; Bruck an der Mur, Styria, Austria
- Died: 19 February 2009 (aged 92); Vienna
- Education: Universität Wien
- Known for: Minkowski–Hlawka theorem
- Scientific career
- Fields: Mathematics
- Workplaces: Universität Wien; Technische Universität Wien
- Doctoral advisor: Nikolaus Hofreiter
- Doctoral students: Rainer Burkard; Wilfried Imrich; Walter Knödel; Hermann Maurer; Harald Niederreiter; Gert Sabidussi; Klaus Schmidt; Wolfgang M. Schmidt; Robert F. Tichy; Johann Pfanzagl

Edmund Hlawka (5 November 1916, Bruck an der Mur, Styria – 19 February 2009) was an Austrian mathematician. He was a leading number theorist. Hlawka did most of his work at the Vienna University of Technology. He was also a visiting professor at Princeton University and the Sorbonne. Hlawka died on 19 February 2009 in Vienna.

== Education and career ==
Hlawka studied at the University of Vienna from 1934 to 1938, when he gained his doctorate under Nikolaus Hofreiter. Among his PhD students were Rainer Burkard, later to become president of the Austrian Society for Operations Research, graph theorist Gert Sabidussi, Cole Prize winner Wolfgang M. Schmidt, Walter Knödel who became one of the first German computer science professors, and Hermann Maurer, also a computer scientist. Through these and other students, Hlawka has over 3000 academic descendants. Hlawka was awarded the Decoration for Services to the Republic of Austria in 2007.

== Honours and awards ==
- Decoration for Science and Art (Austria, 1963)
- City of Vienna Prize for the Humanities (1969)
- Decoration for Services to the Republic of Austria, Grand Decoration of Honour in Gold with Star (2007); Grand Decoration of Honour in Gold (1987)
- Wilhelm Exner Medal (1982).
- Joseph Johann Ritter von Prechtl Medal (1989)
- Erwin Schrödinger Prize

== See also ==
- Minkowski–Hlawka theorem
- Koksma–Hlawka inequality
- 10763 Hlawka, an asteroid named after Edmund Hlawka
