= Hilbert class field =

Field in algebraic number theory

In algebraic number theory, the Hilbert class field $E$ of a number field $K$ is the maximal abelian unramified extension of $K$. Its degree over $K$ equals the class number of $K$ and the Galois group of $E$ over $K$ is canonically isomorphic to the ideal class group of $K$ using Frobenius elements for prime ideals in $K$.

In this context, the Hilbert class field of $K$ is not just unramified at the finite places (the classical ideal theoretic interpretation) but also at the infinite places of $K$. That is, every real embedding of $K$ extends to a real embedding of $E$, rather than to a complex embedding of $E$.

== Examples ==
- If the ring of integers of $K$ is a unique factorization domain, in particular if $K = \mathbb{Q}$, then $K$ is its own Hilbert class field.
- Let $K = \mathbb{Q}(\sqrt{-15})$, of discriminant $-15$. The field $L = \mathbb{Q}(\sqrt{-3}, \sqrt{5})$ has discriminant $225=(-15)^2$ and so is an everywhere unramified extension of $K$, and it is abelian. Using the Minkowski bound, one can show that $K$ has class number 2. Hence, its Hilbert class field is $L$. A non-principal ideal of $K$ is $(2,(1+\sqrt{-15})/2)$, and in $L$ this becomes the principal ideal $((1+\sqrt{5})/2)$.
- The field $\mathbb{Q}(\sqrt{-23})$ has class number 3. Its Hilbert class field can be formed by adjoining a root of $x^3 - x - 1$, which has discriminant $-23$.
- To see why ramification at the archimedean primes must be taken into account, consider the real quadratic field $K=\mathbb{Q}(\sqrt{3})$ obtained by adjoining the square root of 3 to $\mathbb{Q}$. This field has class number 1 and discriminant 12. Its extension $K(i)$ has discriminant $144=12^2$, and so is unramified at all prime ideals in $K$, which means that $K$ admits finite abelian extensions of degree greater than 1 in which all finite primes of $K$ are unramified. This doesn't contradict the Hilbert class field of $K$ being $K$ itself: every proper finite abelian extension of $K$ must ramify at some place, and in the extension $K(i)/K$ there is ramification at the archimedean places: the real embeddings of $K$ extend to complex (rather than real) embeddings of $K(i)$.
- Likewise, for $K=\mathbb{Q}(\sqrt{6})$ (class number 1, discriminant 24), the extension $K(\sqrt{-2},\sqrt{-3})$ has discriminant $576=24^2$, so is unramified at all prime ideals in $K$, but ramified at both real places.
- By the theory of complex multiplication, the Hilbert class field of an imaginary quadratic field is generated by the value of the elliptic modular function at a generator for the ring of integers (as a $\mathbb{Z}$-module).

== History ==
The existence of a (narrow) Hilbert class field for a given number field $K$ was conjectured by David Hilbert and proved by Philipp Furtwängler. The existence of the Hilbert class field is a valuable tool in studying the structure of the ideal class group of a given field.

== Additional properties ==
The Hilbert class field $E$ also satisfies the following:

- $E$ is a finite Galois extension of $K$ and $[E:K]=h_k$, where $h_K$ is the class number of $K$.
- The ideal class group of $K$ is isomorphic to the Galois group of $E$ over $K$.
- Every ideal of $\mathcal{O}_K$ extends to a principal ideal of the ring extension $\mathcal{O}_E$ (principal ideal theorem).
- Every prime ideal $P$ of $\mathcal{O}_K$ decomposes into the product of $h_K/f$ prime ideals in $\mathcal{O}_E$, where $f$ is the order of $[P]$ in the ideal class group of $\mathcal{O}_K$.

In fact, $E$ is the unique field satisfying the first, second, and fourth properties.

== Explicit constructions ==
If $K$ is imaginary quadratic and $A$ is an elliptic curve with complex multiplication by the ring of integers of $K$, then adjoining the j-invariant of $A$ to $K$ gives the Hilbert class field.

== Generalizations ==
In class field theory, one studies the ray class field with respect to a given modulus, which is a formal product of prime ideals (including, possibly, archimedean ones). The ray class field is the maximal abelian extension unramified outside the primes dividing the modulus and satisfying a particular ramification condition at the primes dividing the modulus. The Hilbert class field is then the ray class field with respect to the trivial modulus 1.

The narrow class field is the ray class field with respect to the modulus consisting of all infinite primes. For example, the argument above shows that $\mathbb{Q}(\sqrt{3}, i)$ is the narrow class field of $\mathbb{Q}(\sqrt{3})$.
