= Sandi Klavžar =

Slovenian mathematician

Sandi Klavžar (born 5 February 1962) is a Slovenian mathematician working in the area of graph theory and its applications. He is a professor of mathematics at the University of Ljubljana.

== Education ==
Klavžar received his Ph.D. from the University of Ljubljana in 1990, under the supervision of Wilfried Imrich and Tomaž Pisanski.

== Research ==
Klavžar's research concerns graph products, metric graph theory, chemical graph theory, graph domination, and the Tower of Hanoi. Together with Wilfried Imrich and Richard Hammack, he is the author of the book Handbook of Product Graphs (CRC Press, 2011). Together with Andreas M. Hinz, Uroš Milutinović, and Ciril Petr, he is the author of the book The Tower of Hanoi – Myths and Maths (Springer, Basel, 2013).

== Awards and honors ==
In 2007, Klavžar received the Zois award for exceptional contributions to science and mathematics.
