= Nikolaus Hofreiter =

Austrian mathematician (1904–1990)

Nikolaus, Hofreiter
- Born: 8 May 1904; Linz, Upper Austria, Austria-Hungary
- Died: 23 January 1990 (aged 85); Vienna, Austria
- Scientific career
- Fields: Mathematics
- Doctoral advisor: Philipp Furtwängler
- Doctoral students: Peter M. Gruber; Edmund Hlawka; Wilfried Imrich; Leopold Schmetterer

Nikolaus Hofreiter (8 May 1904 – 23 January 1990) was an Austrian mathematician who worked mainly in number theory.

== Biography ==
Hofreiter went to school in Linz and studied from 1923 in Vienna with Hans Hahn, Wilhelm Wirtinger, Emil Müller at the Technische Universität Wien on descriptive geometry, and Philipp Furtwängler, with whom he obtained his doctorate in 1927 on the reduction theory of quadratic forms (Eine neue Reduktionstheorie für definite quadratische Formen). In 1928 he passed the Lehramtsprüfung examination and completed the probationary year as a teacher in Vienna, but then returned to the university (first as a scientific assistant at the TU Vienna) where in 1929 he was assistant to Furtwängler and then habilitated in 1933. He was even then an excellent teacher, and gave lectures not only in Vienna but also in Graz.

His dissertation and habilitation thesis dealt with the reduction theory of quadratic forms, which Gauss, Charles Hermite and Hermann Minkowski had worked on previously. Hofreiter treated the case of four variables of a problem of Minkowski (Minkowski had solved the problem for two variables, while Robert Remak had solved it for three variables) on the product of inhomogeneous linear forms and achieved significant progress. The complete solution was only found 15 years later (and the general case is still unresolved). In 1934, he proved the existence of infinitely many real quadratic number fields without a Euclidean algorithm. In addition, he dealt with the geometry of numbers and Diophantine approximation.

In 1939, he was an associate professor and married the mathematician Margarete Dostalík (1912–2013). She was also a student of Furtwängler and did important work on algebraic equations and was working as a meteorologist in Berlin at the time. During the Second World War, he moved from Vienna and was a little later at the Hermann Goering Aviation Research Institute in Braunschweig, where his colleagues Wolfgang Gröbner from Vienna, Bernhard Baule from Graz, Ernst Peschl and Josef Laub were already working. Through his work there, together with Gröbner, he started a table of integrals. The first volume, on indefinite integrals, was published by Notdruck (Braunschweig) in 1944 and by Springer in 1949. In 1950, the second volume containing definite integrals appeared. Both parts were widely available through to the 5th 1973/75 edition. His wife, Margaret, assisted with the calculations, as well as the preparation and review of both volumes.

In addition to their work at the Aviation Research Institute, Gröbner and Hofreiter continued to give lectures and seminars at the Technical University of Braunschweig. After the war he returned to Vienna in 1946 and continued to expand on his number theory work. He also worked on linear optimization and numerical mathematics. In 1954, he became a professor, and in 1963/4 became Dean of the Faculty, and in 1965/6, he was Rector of the University of Vienna. In 1974, he retired.

In 1970, Hofreiter became a corresponding member of the Austrian Academy of Sciences. He received the Austrian Cross of Honour for Science and Art, 1st class in 1965, the Gold Medal of Honour of the City of Vienna, the Grand Decoration of Honour in Silver for Services to the Republic of Austria in 1977, the Commander's Cross of the Order of St. Gregory the Great, the Ring of Honour of the Austrian Mathematical Society. He was an honorary senator of the University of Linz.

His doctoral students included Edmund Hlawka, Peter Gruber and Leopold Schmetterer. He has over 1500 academic descendants, primarily through Hlawka.
