= Austrian Statistical Society =

Journal

The Austrian Statistical Society (Österreichischen Statistischen Gesellschaft) is a national scientific organization. It publishes the Austrian Journal of Statistics (OCLC 609923675), formerly known as the Österreichische Zeitschrift für Statistik (OCLC 44588411).

== Journal ==
The official journal of the society is the Austrian Journal of Statistics (ISSN 1026-597X), a quarterly peer-reviewed open access scientific journal published under a Creative Commons Attribution License (CC-BY). It was established in 1972 and covers the use of statistical methods in all kind of theoretical and applied disciplines. Special emphasis is put on methods and results in official statistics.

=== Editors ===
The following persons have been editors-in-chief of the journal:

- 2014–2016 Matthias Templ
- 2004–2013 Herwig Friedl
- 2002–2012 Rudolf Dutter
