= Bob Schmetterer =

American business executive and author (1943–2026)

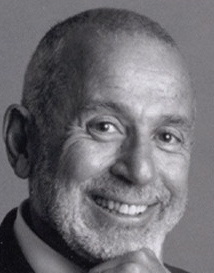
- Born: Robert Allen Schmetterer; November 23, 1943; New York City, U.S.
- Died: March 2026 (aged 82)
- Education: Fairleigh Dickinson University
- Occupation: Advertising executive

Robert Allen Schmetterer (November 23, 1943 – March 2026) was an American business executive and author. He was chairman and CEO of Euro RSCG Worldwide and president and COO of communications group Havas.

== Background ==
Born in New York City, Schmetterer grew up in Hillsdale, New Jersey, and graduated from Pascack Valley High School in 1961. Schmetterer completed his BS in psychology from Fairleigh Dickinson University in 1967, and completed an MBA at the same school in 1970. While attending university, he worked for the British Motor Corporation, where he originated the idea for branding and marketing accessories for their MG and Austin-Healy sports cars as part of the company's overall marketing strategy. Then in 1968 he was hired by Volvo of America as marketing research director.

== Advertising career ==
Schmetterer joined creative advertising agency Scali McCabe Sloves in 1971 where his first client assignment was Perdue chicken, which would be named number 67 on Advertising Age's top 100 advertising campaigns of the 20th Century. In 1980 Schmetterer was appointed managing director and Chief operating officer of the New York-based Scali McCabe Sloves firm.

In 1984, Schmetterer became president and chief executive officer of an international joint venture with Young & Rubicam of New York and Eurocom S.A. of Paris, France: HCM Advertising Worldwide (Havas Conseil Marsteller). In 1987 Schmetterer then became a founding partner and president of the agency to become known as Messner, Vetere, Berger, McNamee, Schmetterer (MVBMS). Under Schmetterer's leadership the company was an early innovator in digital advertising and marketing, website creation, and in the first Internet "banner ads." As a result of these kinds of innovations and progressively growing client base, MVBMS became the fastest growing agency in the United States in the early 1990s.

In 1992, after being acquired by publicly owned French group Euro RSCG, Messner, Vetere, Berger, McNamee, Schmetterer became their New York office and Schmetterer was asked to join their board of directors. Five years later, he was appointed chairman and chief executive officer of Euro RSCG Worldwide. Schmetterer remained at the helm for seven years, as the agency grew to 233 offices in 75 countries and billing grew to $13 billion. Under Schmetterer's leadership Euro RSCG became the largest digital agency worldwide. By 2000, Scott Donaton (Publisher of Advertising Age and Entertainment Weekly) called Schmetterer a "visionary for new creativity". In 2002, in addition to his chief executive role at Euro RSCG, Schmetterer was named president and chief operating officer of French advertising and communications holding company Havas. Early in 2004, Schmetterer announced his retirement after thirty-three years in the ad industry.

Schmetterer managed the strategy and advertising for clients including Volvo cars in North America as well as globally, Pioneer Electronics, Maxell Tape, MCI, Dannon Yogurt and Intel. His advertising campaigns for Volvo also made the Advertising Age top 100 campaigns of the 20th Century list, coming in at number 90.

== Author and speaker ==
In 2003, Schmetterer wrote the book Leap! A Revolution in Creative Business Strategy, which was published by John Wiley & Sons and eventually translated into six additional languages: English, French, Portuguese, Spanish, Italian and Chinese. The book was based upon the concept of "Creative Business Ideas": a concept developed by Schmetterer for use at Euro RSCG (that later trademarked the idea), whereby advertising agencies would go beyond pure advertising and communications strategy, and use non-linear creative thinking to develop ideas that could become central to companies products, services, and business strategy. Schmetterer has been keynote speaker at industry conferences sponsored by the American Association of Advertising Agencies and the Cannes International Advertising Festival. In 2010 he also participated in The Future of Television Conference at New York University Stern School of Business.

== Post-retirement ==
Schmetterer retired from his advertising career in 2004. In 2007 he volunteered his talents at the Ocean Reef Club in Key Largo. He was asked to Chair the Marketing Committee and upgrade their marketing efforts. Schmetterer revamped the advertising and marketing processes and created an Ocean Reef Magazine which was given to interested new members. Like he did years ago for Volvo (Drive Safely) he penned the Club's brand, "A Unique Way of Life". In 2009 he was asked to join the Executive Board and became Chairman of the Board in 2015. His retirement from the board in 2019, makes him the longest serving director in the history of the Ocean Reef Club.

Later that same year, New York Yacht Club Commodore Christopher Culver asked him to Chair the Club's Communications Committee. "We were looking to create a significant change in our communications capabilities and we needed a member to lead..." he said. He updated and transformed all elements of communications within two years. But his most significant addition was the establishment of "The Virtual Clubhouse" that kept the Club engaged with its members during Covid. Schmetterer created events, using new technologies and live broadcasts to keep members engaged remotely. Because of his transformational leadership, he was awarded the New York Yacht Club Metal in 2021...the highest honor that can be given to a New York Yacht Club member. Other recipients of the medal include Ted Turner, Dennis Conner and Gary Jobson. Schmetterer is one of only 25 recipients in the history of the New York Yacht Club to be so honored.

== Personal life and death ==
Shortly after high school he married Tara Deppert with whom he had two sons. Schmetterer had one granddaughter. He has been married to Stacy Chiarello Schmetterer since 1987. Together, they pursued philanthropic interests in the arts, education, animals, nature and the sea. The two were also long-time yacht enthusiasts. He had many yachts, including an 80-foot Marlow Explorer named Blue Moon. His fleet included a 2012 51-foot Dettling - "Fandango", a vintage Hinkley picnic boat built in 1997- "Cavalier" (one of only three built without a jet engine), a 22-foot Pulsifer Hampton wooden launch - "Summer Moon" built in 2000, and a Haven 12.5 - "Moon Shadow", 16-foot cold- molded wooden sailboat also built in Maine in 2000, and a 1966 13-foot fully restored Boston Whaler which he shares with one of his sons. Each spring and fall from 2006 Schmetterer and his wife cruised the east coast between Maine and Key Largo, stopping at their home on Marthas Vineyard.

Schmetterer died in March 2026, at the age of 82.
