= Eugenie Goldstern =

Austrian geographer

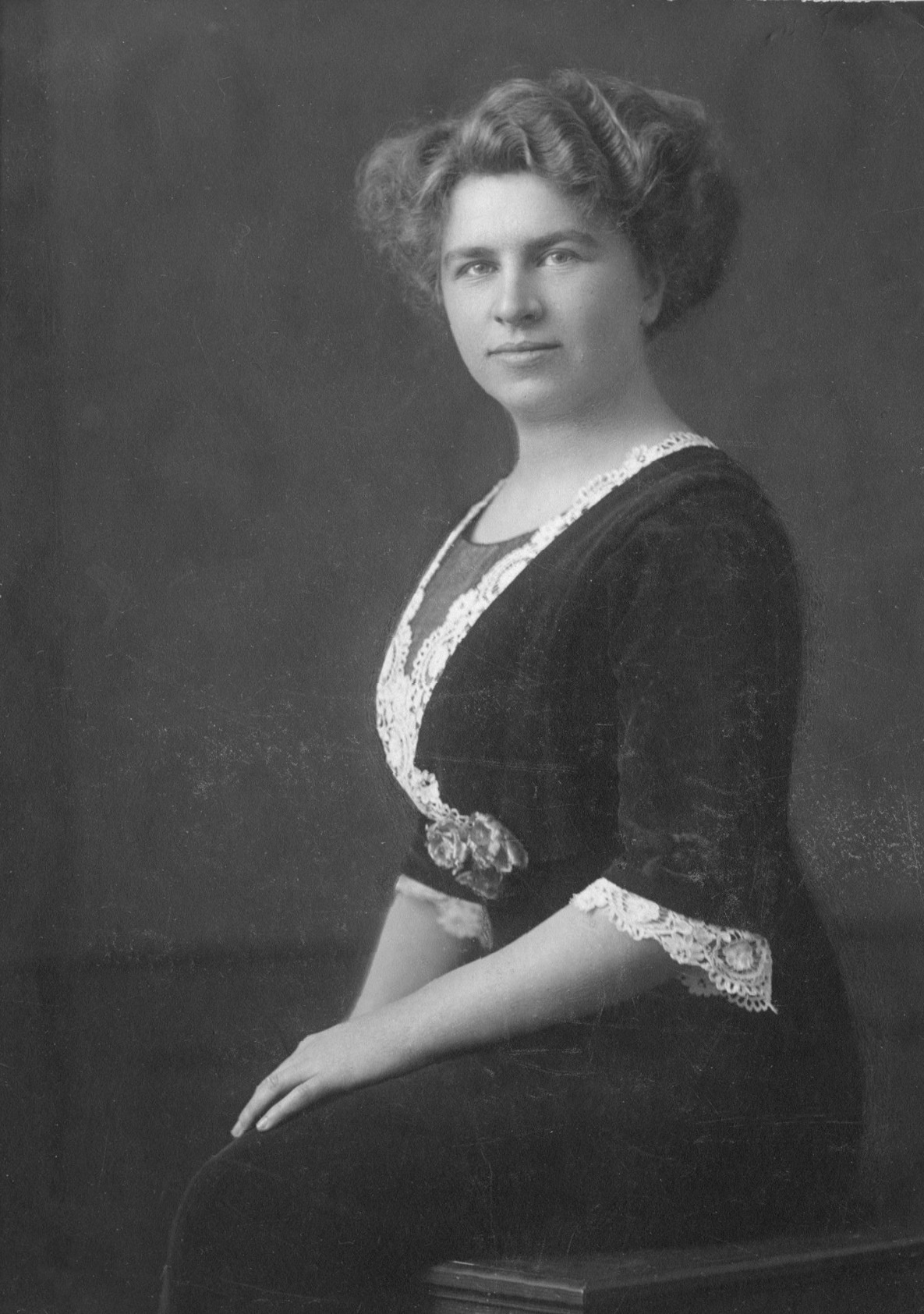
- Born: 1 May 1884; Odessa, Russian Empire
- Died: 14 June 1942 (aged 58); Sobibór extermination camp, Poland
- Occupation: Ethnographer

Eugenie Goldstern (1884–1942) was an Austrian anthropologist who conducted research on Alpine folk culture in Switzerland. In 1942 she was killed in Sobibór extermination camp in Poland during the Holocaust.

== Biography ==
Eugenie Goldstern was born in Odessa in 1884 to Jewish parents, the youngest of 14 children. In 1905, she relocated to Austria and, five years later, began to study anthropology at the University of Vienna. There, she studied under Michael Haberlandt, at the time a leading figure in the study and collection of folk art. Haberlandt and his son, Arthur Haberlandt, would go on to become supporters of the Third Reich and sever their ties with Jewish colleagues.

Goldstern's research interests centered on the culture of the Western Alps. Focusing on the commune of Bessans, Goldstern created one of the first-ever ethnographic monographs about a community, writing about life and economy in a European mountain village. Her research began in 1912, and she spent the winter of 1913-1914 living in the community. While in Switzerland, she was supported by the ethnographer Arnold van Gennep. Her investigations markedly departed from typical scholarly opinion at the time, the latter portraying the culture of the Alps as idealized and unchanging. Of particular focus in her studies were small, handmade toy objects. Her first and last articles published in the Viennese journal of ethnography Wiener Zeitschrift für Volkskunde focused on toys. She donated many items she collected in the course of her work to the Museum of Ethnology, Vienna.

The outbreak of World War I disrupted Goldstern's research. After continuing her studies at the University of Neuchatel, she completed her PhD at the University of Fribourg in 1920, under the direction of professor Paul Girardin.

As a woman in a male-dominated field and in the increasingly antisemitic climate of Austria, Goldstern struggled to find a permanent position in her field. By the end of the 1920s, Goldstern stopped publishing and withdrew from her field research. In 1937, Goldstern's work, along with that of von Gennep, was featured in a display about Savoie at the Exposition Internationale in Paris. However, with the takeover of Austria by Nazi Germany in 1938, Jewish people were officially excluded from public life and subjected to antisemitic racial laws. Many of her family members fled Vienna, but Goldstern remained in the city.

== Death ==
On 14 June 1942 Goldstern was deported to the Sobibór extermination camp in Poland, where she was killed.

== Posthumous exhibitions ==
In 2004–2005, the Vienna Museum of Ethnology displayed Goldstern's collection of Swiss folk art objects in an exhibition titled "Ur-Ethnographie." The Musée dauphinois and the Musée savoisien held an exhibition about her and her work in 2007.

== Publications ==
- Alpine Spielzeugtiere. Ein Beitrag zur Erforschung des primitiven Spielzeuges, in: Wiener Zeitschrift für Volkskunde, 29. Jg., Heft 3–4, Wien 1924
- Beiträge zur Volkskunde des Lammertales mit besonderer Berücksichtigung von Abtenau (Tännengau), in: Zeitschrift für österreichische Volkskunde, Wien 1918
- Bessans, Vie d'un village de haute Maurienne, Traduction Francis Tracq et Melle Schaeffer, Challes-les-Eaux 1987
- Eine volkskundliche Erkundungsreise im Aostatale (Piemont). (Vorläufige Mitteilung), in: Wiener Zeitschrift für Volkskunde, 28. Jg., Heft 1, Wien 1923
- Hochgebirgsvolk in Savoyen und Graubünden. Ein Beitrag zur romanischen Volkskunde. I. Bessans, Volkskundliche monographische Studie über eine savoyische Hochgebirgsgemeinde (Frankreich). II. Beiträge zur Volkskunde des bündnerischen Münstertales (Schweiz), Wien 1922
- 'Eugénie Goldstern (1884-1942), Ethnologue de l'arc alpin: Oeuvres complètes', (Trans: Gansel, Mireille) 2008 (ISBN 9782355670053)
