= Prize of the Austrian Mathematical Society =

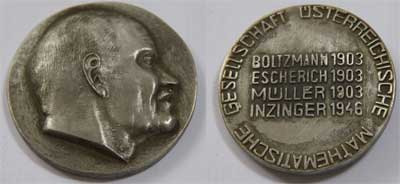
Medal of the Austrian Mathematical Society

The Prize of the Austrian Mathematical Society (German: Förderungspreis) is the highest mathematics award in Austria. It is awarded every year by the Austrian Mathematical Society to a promising young mathematician for outstanding achievements. A substantial part of the work must have been performed in Austria. The recipient receives, in addition to a monetary reward, a medal showing Rudolf Inzinger. The prize was established in 1955 and is awarded since 1956.

== See also ==
- Awards and Prizes of the Austrian Mathematical Society (in german)
- List of mathematics awards
