= Austrian Mathematical Society =

National mathematical society of Austria

- Österreichische Mathematische Gesellschaft
- Abbreviation: ÖMG
- Formation: 1903; 123 years ago
- Type: Mathematical society
- Purpose: Promoting Mathematics
- Location: Austria
- Official language: German
- President: Johannes Wallner
- Website: http://www.oemg.ac.at/

The Austrian Mathematical Society (German: Österreichische Mathematische Gesellschaft) is the national mathematical society of Austria and a member society of the European Mathematical Society.

== History ==
The society was founded in 1903 by Ludwig Boltzmann, Gustav von Escherich, and Emil Müller as Mathematical Society in Vienna (German: Mathematische Gesellschaft in Wien).

After the Second World War it resumed operation in May 1946 and was formally reestablished at the 10th of August 1946 by Rudolf Inzinger. In autumn 1948 the name was changed to Austrian Mathematical Society.

== Publications ==
It publishes the "International Mathematical News" (German: Internationale Mathematische Nachrichten) with three issues per year (not to be confused with Mathematische Nachrichten, an unrelated mathematics journal). It was issued for the first time in 1947. It also publishes the mathematics journal Monatshefte für Mathematik in cooperation with Springer-Verlag.

== Prizes ==
Every year it awards its main prize (German: Förderungspreis) to a promising young mathematician. It also awards smaller prizes for the best dissertation, diploma and high-school thesis in mathematics.
