= Shimura =

Shimura (written: 志村 or 紫村) is a Japanese surname. Notable people with the surname include:

- Goro Shimura (志村 五郎; 1930–2019), Japanese mathematician
  - Shimura correspondence
  - Eichler–Shimura congruence relation
  - Shimura variety
- Hitomi Shimura (紫村 仁美; born 1990), Japanese hurdler
- Ken Shimura (志村 けん; 1950–2020), Japanese comedian and actor
- Ko Shimura (志村 滉; born 1996), Japanese footballer
- Noboru Shimura (志村 謄; born 1993), Japanese footballer
- Shunta Shimura (志村 駿太; born 1997), Japanese footballer
- Takako Shimura (志村 貴子; born 1973), Japanese manga artist
- Takashi Shimura (志村 喬; 1905–1982), Japanese actor
- Yoshio Shimura (志村 義夫; born 1940), Japanese cyclist
- Sun Shimura (志村 すん; born 1982), Filipino politician
- Yumi Shimura (志村 由美; born 1982), Japanese voice actress

== Fictional characters ==
- Inspector Shimura, a character in Judge Dredd Megazine
- Rei Shimura, a character in a series of mystery novels by Sujata Massey
- Shinpachi Shimura (志村 新八), a character in the manga series Gintama
- Danzo Shimura (志村ダンゾウ), a character in Naruto
- Nana Shimura, a character in My Hero Academia
- Lord Shimura, a character in video game Ghost of Tsushima
