= Ramanujan–Petersson conjecture =

Unsolved problem in mathematics

In mathematics, the Ramanujan-Petersson conjecture is a conjecture concerning the growth rate of coefficients of modular forms and more generally, automorphic forms. The name of the conjecture comes from Srinivasa Ramanujan, who proposed it for Ramanujan tau function, and Hans Petersson, who generalized it for coefficients of modular forms.

In the version for modular forms, the conjecture says that for any cusp form of weight $k$ with Fourier coefficients $a_n$ and every $\epsilon > 0$ that
$$a_n = O_\epsilon \bigl( n^{(k-1)/2+\epsilon} \bigr)$$
The generalization for automorphic forms is more sophisticated due to counterexamples found for many of the simplest propositions. Its current form was proposed by Howe and Piatetski-Shapiro, and states that for a globally generic cuspidal automorphic representation of a connected reductive group that admits a Whittaker model, each local component of the representation is tempered.

For modular forms, the conjecture was proven following the extensive work of Erich Hecke, Michio Kuga and Pierre Deligne. Despite many similarities between modular forms and Maass forms, the conjecture's counterpart for Maass forms is still an open problem, as the Deligne method which solves the holomorphic case does not work in the real-analytic case of Maass forms. The generalization of the conjecture for automorphic forms also remains an open problem.

== Ramanujan conjecture ==
Let $q=e^{2\pi iz}$. The discriminant modular form is usually defined by
$$\Delta(z)=q\prod_{n>0}\left (1-q^n \right)^{24}=\eta(z)^{24},$$
where $\eta(z)$ is the Dedekind eta function. $\Delta(z)$ is a holomorphic cusp form of weight 12 and level 1. The Ramanujan tau function $\tau(n)$ is defined for natural numbers by the Fourier series coefficients of this modular form:
$$\Delta(z)= \sum_{n=1}^{\infty}\tau(n)q^n=q-24q^2+252q^3- 1472q^4 + 4830q^5-\cdots.$$
Ramanujan (1916) conjectured the following:

1. $\tau$ is multiplicative.
2. $\tau$ is not completely multiplicative, but has the following recursive dependence for prime $p$ and $j\geq 2$: $\tau(p^{j+1})=\tau(p)\tau(p^{j}) - p^{11}\tau(p^{j-1})$
3. $\vert \tau(p)\vert \leq 2p^{11/2}$ for all primes $p$.

As noted by Ramanujan, these conjectures imply that $\vert \tau(n)\vert \leq d(n) n^{11/2}$ for all $n \ge 1$, where $d(n)$ is the number-of-divisor function. A classic bound on $d(n)$ thus yields

$$\tau(n) = O \bigl( n^{11/2+\epsilon} \bigl).$$

In 1917, L. Mordell proved the first two relations using techniques from complex analysis, specifically using what are now known as Hecke operators. The proof that the full generality estimate follows from three previous conjectures was given by Michio Kuga with contributions from Mikio Sato, Goro Shimura, and Yasutaka Ihara, followed by Deligne (1971). The third statement followed from the proof of the Weil conjectures (more precisely, its counterpart of Riemann Hypothesis for local zeta functions) by Deligne (1974).

=== Ramanujan L-function ===
Ramanujan's original hypothesis was inspired by his research on a particular L-function, nowadays called the Ramanujan L-function. It can be defined as a Dirichlet series for Ramanujan tau function:
$$L(s,\tau)=\sum_{n=1}^{\infty}\frac{\tau(n)}{n^s}.$$
This series arises naturally as a Mellin transform of $\Delta(z)$. From general estimation for tau function
$$\sum_{k=1}^{n}\tau(k)=O\bigl(n^{13/2+\epsilon} \bigr),$$
so this series converges absolutely for $\operatorname{Re}(s)>\frac{13}{2}$. On the rest of the complex plane, the Ramanujan L-function can be defined by analytic continuation of this series. Like other L-functions, the Ramanujan L-function satisfies a functional equation:
$$\frac{\Gamma (s)L(s,\tau)}{(2\pi)^s}=
\frac{\Gamma(12-s)L(12-s,\tau)}{(2\pi)^{12-s}}.$$
From the mulitplicative property of the tau function, the L-series in the domain of convergence can be written as the following Euler product:
$$L(s,\tau)=\prod_{p\text{ prime}}\sum_{n=0}^{\infty}\frac{\tau(p^n)}{p^{ns}}.$$
Since the tau function is not completely multiplicative, the sums cannot be written using geometric series like in the case of the Riemann zeta function or Dirichlet L-functions. However, using recursive dependence for powers of primes, this sum can be simplified and we can write

$$L(s,\tau)=\prod_p \frac{1}{1-\tau(p)p^{-s}+p^{11-2s}}.$$

Ramanujan used the properties above only conditionally. He checked some of the quadratic equations obtained from denominators in the formula for the L-function obtained by the substitution $u=p^{-s}$:
$$1+\tau(p)u-p^{11}u^2=0.$$
He observed that if such equations have non-real roots or double real roots, then from its discriminant it follows that
$$\Delta = \tau (p)^2 - 4p^{11} \leq 0,$$
and consequently $\vert \tau (p)\vert \leq 2p^{\frac{11}{2}}.$ Equivalently, since all coefficients of the equation are real and non-real roots appear in conjugate pairs, we can say that this holds if roots of this equation lie on the same straight line in the complex plane and
$$\operatorname{Re}(u_1) = \operatorname{Re}(u_2).$$
This property follows exactly from the Riemann hypothesis counterpart for local zeta functions shown by Deligne.

Ramanujan also conjectured, analogously to the Riemann hypothesis, that all nontrivial zeros should lie on the critical line $\operatorname{Re}(s)=6$, and observed that the conjecture implies
$$\tau(n) = O \bigl( n^{11/2+\epsilon} \bigr).$$
The Riemann hypothesis for $L(s,\tau)$ is still unproven, but this estimate was proven unconditionally.

== Ramanujan–Petersson conjecture for modular form s ==
For any modular form $f(z)$ of weight $k \geq 2$ with respect to an arithmetic subgroup $\Gamma \subseteq SL(2,\mathbb{Z})$, we can write it as Fourier series
$$f(z)=\sum^\infty_{n=0}a_nq^n,$$
where $q=e^{2\pi iz}$ as before.

If we have $a_0=0$, we say that $f(z)$ is cusp form. In 1937, Erich Hecke used Hecke operators to generalize the method of Mordell's proof of the first two conjectures for holomorphic cusp forms. The more general Ramanujan–Petersson conjecture for holomorphic cusp forms for congruence subgroups was proposed in Petersson (1930) and has a similar formulation:
$$a_n = O\bigl( n^{(k-1)/2+\epsilon} \bigr).$$
Deligne (1971) used the Eichler–Shimura isomorphism to reduce this conjecture to the Weil conjectures that he later proved. This is also true for the case $k=1$, where it is a result of Deligne & Serre (1974).

In the case $k \geq 3$, Hans Petersson introduced a metric on the space of modular forms, called the Petersson metric (also see Weil–Petersson metric). Under the Petersson metric, it can be shown that we can define orthogonality on the space of modular forms as on the subspace of cusp forms and its orthogonal space; moreover they both have finite dimensions. Furthermore, we can concretely calculate the dimension of the space of holomorphic modular forms using the Riemann–Roch theorem (see the dimensions of modular forms).

As of 2025, the version of the Ramanujan–Petersson conjecture for Maass forms is still open. Deligne's method, which works well in the holomorphic case, does not work in the real analytic case.

=== L-functions for modular forms ===
Given a modular form
$$f(z)=\sum^\infty_{n=0}a_nq^n$$
one can form the Dirichlet series
$$\varphi(s)=\sum^\infty_{n=1} \frac{a_n}{n^s}.$$
This correspondence between $f$ and $\varphi$ is one to one. Denote
$$R(s) = (2\pi)^{-s}\Gamma(s)\varphi(s),$$
and
$$g(x)=f(ix)-a_0 \quad \text{for } x > 0.$$
$R(s)$ is related to $g(x)$ via the Mellin transformation:
$$R(s)=\int^\infty_0g(x)x^{s-1} \, dx.$$
Applying the inverse Mellin transform gives
$$g(x) = \frac{1}{2\pi i} \int_{\operatorname{Re}(s)=\sigma_0}R(s)x^{-s} \, ds.$$
Because $a_n = O\bigl(n^{k-1+\epsilon}\bigr)$, $\varphi(s)$ converges absolutely for $\operatorname{Re}(s) > k$. In 1929, Wilton proved that this Dirichlet series has an analytic continuation and at most one simple pole at $s=k$ (for non-cusp forms) with residue

$$a_0 = (-1)^{\frac{k}{2}}\mathop{\rm Res}_{s=k}R(s) = (-1)^{\frac{k}{2}}\frac{(2\pi)^k}{(k-1)!}\mathop{\rm Res}_{s=k}\varphi(s).$$

Using the notation above, it is seen that $R$ satisfies the functional equation

$$R(s-k) = (-1)^{\frac{k}{2}}R(s).$$

The Mellin transform relates Dirichlet series that satisfy the above functional equation with automorphic forms of a discrete subgroup of $SL(2,\mathbb{Z})$. From the residue formula, we see that exactly for cusp forms this series has an analytic continuation to an entire function. This shows that Ramanujan-Petersson conjecture fails for non-cusp forms, since every Dirichlet series with coefficients satisfying it is absolutely convergent for $\operatorname{Re}>\frac{k+1}{2}$ and if $k>1$ it cannot have pole at $s=k$.

From the multiplicative property of coefficients, the existence of Euler product for this L-function follows. From the recursive property, rewriting sums of powers of primes as reciprocals of polynomials of $p^{-s}$ follows.

== Ramanujan–Petersson conjecture for automorphic forms ==
Satake (1966) reformulated the Ramanujan–Petersson conjecture in terms of automorphic representations for GL(2) as saying that the local components of automorphic representations lie in the principal series, and suggested this condition as a generalization of the Ramanujan–Petersson conjecture to automorphic forms on other groups. Another way of saying this is that the local components of cusp forms should be tempered.

However, several authors found counter-examples for anisotropic groups where the component at infinity was not tempered.Kurokawa (1978) and Howe & Piatetski-Shapiro (1979) showed that the conjecture was also false even for some quasi-split and split groups, by constructing automorphic forms for the unitary group U(2, 1) and the symplectic group Sp(4) that are non-tempered almost everywhere, related to the representation θ_{10}.

After the counterexamples were found, Howe & Piatetski-Shapiro (1979) suggested that a reformulation of the conjecture should still hold. The current formulation is for a globally generic cuspidal automorphic representation of a connected reductive group, where the generic assumption means that the representation admits a Whittaker model. It states that each local component of such a representation should be tempered.

It is an observation due to Langlands that establishing functoriality of symmetric powers of automorphic representations of GL(n) will give a proof of this version of the Ramanujan–Petersson conjecture. For reductive groups other than GL(n), the generalized Ramanujan conjecture would follow from principle of Langlands functoriality.

=== The Ramanujan–Petersson conjecture over global function fields ===
Drinfeld's proof of the global Langlands correspondence for GL(2) over a global function field leads towards a proof of the Ramanujan–Petersson conjecture. Lafforgue (2002) successfully extended Drinfeld's shtuka technique to the case of GL(n) in positive characteristic. Via a different technique that extends the Langlands–Shahidi method to include global function fields, Lomelí (2009) proves the Ramanujan conjecture for the classical groups.

== Bounds towards Ramanujan over number fields ==
In order to understand the Ramanujan bounds for GL(n), consider a unitary cuspidal automorphic representation:

$$\pi = \bigotimes \pi_v.$$

Langlands classification can be used for the archimedean places. The Bernstein–Zelevinsky classification tells us that each p-adic place π_{v} can be obtained via unitary parabolic induction from a representation:

$$\tau_{1,v} \otimes \cdots \otimes \tau_{d,v}.$$

Here each $\tau_{i,v}$ is a representation of GL(n_{i}), over the place v, of the form

$$\tau_{i_0,v} \otimes \left|\det\right|_v^{\sigma_{i,v}}$$

with $\tau_{i_0,v}$ tempered. Given n ≥ 2, a Ramanujan bound is a number δ ≥ 0 such that

$$\max_i \left |\sigma_{i,v} \right | \leq \delta.$$

Obtaining the best possible bounds towards the generalized Ramanujan conjecture in the case of number fields has caught the attention of many mathematicians. Each improvement is considered a milestone in the world of modern number theory. The generalized Ramanujan-Petersson conjecture is equivalent to the bound:

$$\delta = 0$$

Jacquet, Piatetskii-Shapiro & Shalika (1983) obtained a first bound of:

$$\delta = \frac{1}{2}$$

for the general linear group GL(n), known as the trivial bound. An important breakthrough was made by Luo, Rudnick & Sarnak (1999), who currently hold the best general bound of:

$$\delta = \frac{1}{2}-\frac{1}{n^2+1}$$

for arbitrary n and any number field.

In special case of GL(2), best established bound is δ = 7/64. Original result of Kim and Sarnak in Kim (2002) was for number field being rational numbers, which was obtained as a consequence of the functoriality result of on the symmetric fourth obtained via the Langlands–Shahidi method. Generalization of the Kim-Sarnak result to an arbitrary number field is possible by the results of Blomer & Brumley (2011).

An important example are the classical groups, where the best possible bounds were obtained by Cogdell et al. (2004) as a consequence of their Langlands functorial lift.

== Consequences ==
An application of the Ramanujan conjecture is the explicit construction of Ramanujan graphs by Lubotzky, Phillips and Sarnak. Indeed, the name "Ramanujan graph" was derived from this connection.

Another consequence of Ramanujan–Petersson conjecture for the general linear group GL(n) is Selberg's 1/4 conjecture about eigenvalues of the Laplacian for some discrete groups.
