= Cuspidal representation =

In number theory, cuspidal representations are certain representations of algebraic groups that occur discretely in $L^2$ spaces. The term cuspidal is derived, at a certain distance, from the cusp forms of classical modular form theory. In the contemporary formulation of automorphic representations, representations take the place of holomorphic functions; these representations may be of adelic algebraic groups.

When the group is the general linear group $\operatorname{GL}_2$, the cuspidal representations are directly related to cusp forms and Maass forms. For the case of cusp forms, each Hecke eigenform (newform) corresponds to a cuspidal representation.

== Formulation ==
Let $G$ be a reductive algebraic group over a number field $K$ and let $\mathbb{A}$ denote the adeles of $K$. The group $G(K)$ embeds diagonally in the group $G(\mathbb{A})$ by sending $g$ in $G(K)$ to the tuple $(g_p)_p$ in $G(\mathbb{A})$ with $g=g_p$ for all (finite and infinite) primes $p$.

Let $Z$ denote the center of $G$ and let $\omega$ be a continuous unitary character from $Z(K)\setminus Z(\mathbb{A})^\times$ to $\C^\times$. Fix a Haar measure on $G(\mathbb{A})$ and let $L^2_0(G(K)\setminus G(\mathbb{A}),\omega)$ denote the Hilbert space of complex-valued measurable functions $f$ on $G(\mathbb{A})$ satisfying

1. $f(\gamma g)=f(g)$ for all $\gamma\in G(K)$,
2. $f(gz)=f(g)\omega(z)$ for all $z\in Z(\mathbb{A})$,
3. $\textstyle\int_{Z(\mathbb{A})G(K)\,\setminus\, G(\mathbb{A})} |f(g)|^2\,dg < \infty$,
4. $\textstyle \int_{U(K)\,\setminus \,U(\mathbb{A})}f(ug)\,du = 0$ for all unipotent radicals $U$ of all proper parabolic subgroups of $G(\mathbb{A})$ and $g\in G(\mathbb{A})$.

The vector space $L^2_0(G(K)\setminus G(\mathbb{A}),\omega)$ is called the space of cusp forms with central character ω on $G(\mathbb{A})$. A function appearing in such a space is called a cuspidal function.

A cuspidal function generates a unitary representation of the group $G(\mathbb{A})$ on the complex Hilbert space $V_f$ generated by the right translates of $f$. Here the action of $g\in G(\mathbb{A})$ on $V_f$ is given by

$$(g \cdot u)(x) = u(xg), \qquad u(x) = \sum_j c_j f(xg_j) \in V_f.$$

The space of cusp forms with central character $\omega$ decomposes into a direct sum of Hilbert spaces

$$L^2_0(G(K)\setminus G(\mathbb{A}),\omega) = \widehat{\bigoplus}_{(\pi,V_\pi)} m_\pi V_\pi$$

where the sum is over irreducible subrepresentations of $L^2_0(G(K)\setminus G(\mathbb{A}),\omega)$ and the $m_\pi$ are positive integers (i.e. each irreducible subrepresentation occurs with finite multiplicity). A cuspidal representation of G($\mathbb{A}$) is such a subrepresentation $(\pi, V_\pi)$ for some $\omega$.

The groups for which the multiplicities $m_\pi$ all equal $1$ are said to have the multiplicity-one property.

== See also ==
- Jacquet module
