= Eisenstein ideal =

Mathematical ideal related to a modular curve

In mathematics, the Eisenstein ideal is an ideal in the endomorphism ring of the Jacobian variety of a modular curve, consisting roughly of elements of the Hecke algebra of Hecke operators that annihilate the Eisenstein series. It was introduced by Barry Mazur (1977), in studying the rational points of modular curves. An Eisenstein prime is a prime in the support of the Eisenstein ideal (this has nothing to do with primes in the Eisenstein integers).

== Definition ==
Let N be a rational prime, and define

J_{0}(N) = J

to be the Jacobian variety of the modular curve

X_{0}(N) = X.

There are endomorphisms T_{l} of J for each prime number l not dividing N. These come from the Hecke operator, considered first as an algebraic correspondence on X, and from there as acting on divisor classes, which gives the action on J. There is also a Fricke involution w (and Atkin–Lehner involutions if N is composite). The Eisenstein ideal, in the (unital) subring of End(J) generated as a ring by the T_{l}, is generated as an ideal by the elements

T_{l} − l - 1

for all l not dividing N, and by

w + 1.

== Geometric definition ==
Suppose that T* is the ring generated by the Hecke operators acting on all modular forms for Γ_{0}(N) (not just the cusp forms). The ring T of Hecke operators on the cusp forms is a quotient of T*, so Spec(T) can be viewed as a subscheme of Spec(T*). Similarly Spec(T*) contains a line (called the Eisenstein line) isomorphic to Spec(Z) coming from the action of Hecke operators on the Eisenstein series. The Eisenstein ideal is the ideal defining the intersection of the Eisenstein line with Spec(T) in Spec(T*).

== Example ==
- The Eisenstein ideal can also be defined for higher weight modular forms. Suppose that T is the full Hecke algebra generated by Hecke operators T_{n} acting on the 2-dimensional space of modular forms of level 1 and weight 12.This space is 2 dimensional, spanned by the Eigenforms given by the Eisenstein series E_{12} and the modular discriminant Δ. The map taking a Hecke operator T_{n} to its eigenvalues (σ_{11}(n),τ(n)) gives a homomorphism from T into the ring Z×Z (where τ is the Ramanujan tau function and σ_{11}(n) is the sum of the 11th powers of the divisors of n). The image is the set of pairs (c,d) with c and d congruent mod 691 because of Ramanujan's congruence σ_{11}(n) ≡ τ(n) mod 691. The Hecke algebra of Hecke operators acting on the cusp form Δ is just isomorphic to Z. If we identify it with Z then the Eisenstein ideal is (691).
