= Shimura variety =

Mathematical concept

In number theory, a Shimura variety is a higher-dimensional analogue of a modular curve that arises as a quotient variety of a Hermitian symmetric space by a congruence subgroup of a reductive algebraic group defined over Q. Shimura varieties are not algebraic varieties but are families of algebraic varieties. Shimura curves are the one-dimensional Shimura varieties. Hilbert modular surfaces and Siegel modular varieties are among the best known classes of Shimura varieties.

Special instances of Shimura varieties were originally introduced by Goro Shimura in the course of his generalization of the complex multiplication theory. Shimura showed that while initially defined analytically, they are arithmetic objects, in the sense that they admit models defined over a number field, the reflex field of the Shimura variety. In the 1970s, Pierre Deligne created an axiomatic framework for the work of Shimura. In 1979, Robert Langlands remarked that Shimura varieties form a natural realm of examples for which equivalence between motivic and automorphic L-functions postulated in the Langlands program can be tested. Automorphic forms realized in the cohomology of a Shimura variety are more amenable to study than general automorphic forms; in particular, there is a construction attaching Galois representations to them.

== Definition ==
=== Shimura datum ===
Let S = Res_{C/R} G_{m} be the Weil restriction of the multiplicative group from complex numbers to real numbers. It is a real algebraic group, whose group of R-points, S(R), is C^{*} and group of C-points is C^{*}×C^{*}. A Shimura datum is a pair (G, X) consisting of a (connected) reductive algebraic group G defined over the field Q of rational numbers and a G(R)-conjugacy class X of homomorphisms h: S → G_{R} satisfying the following axioms:

- For any h in X, only weights (0,0), (1,−1), (−1,1) may occur in g_{C}, i.e. the complexified Lie algebra of G decomposes into a direct sum

$$\mathfrak{g}\otimes\mathbb{C}=\mathfrak{k}\oplus\mathfrak{p}^{+}\oplus\mathfrak{p}^{-},$$

where for any z ∈ S, h(z) acts trivially on the first summand and via $z/\bar{z}$ (respectively, $\bar{z}/z$) on the second (respectively, third) summand.

- The adjoint action of h(i) induces a Cartan involution on the adjoint group of G_{R}.
- The adjoint group of G_{R} does not admit a factor H defined over Q such that the projection of h on H is trivial.

It follows from these axioms that X has a unique structure of a complex manifold (possibly, disconnected) such that for every representation ρ: G_{R} → GL(V), the family (V, ρ ⋅ h) is a holomorphic family of Hodge structures; moreover, it forms a variation of Hodge structure, and X is a finite disjoint union of hermitian symmetric domains.

=== Shimura variety ===
Let A_{ƒ} be the ring of finite adeles of Q. For every sufficiently small compact open subgroup K of G(A_{ƒ}), the double coset space

$$\operatorname{Sh}_K(G,X) = G(\mathbb{Q})\backslash X\times G(\mathbb{A}_f)/K$$

is a finite disjoint union of locally symmetric varieties of the form $\Gamma_i\backslash X^+$, where the plus superscript indicates a connected component. The varieties Sh_{K}(G,X) are complex algebraic varieties and they form an inverse system over all sufficiently small compact open subgroups K. This inverse system

$$(\operatorname{Sh}_K(G,X))_K$$

admits a natural right action of G(A_{ƒ}). It is called the Shimura variety associated with the Shimura datum (G, X) and denoted Sh(G, X).

== History ==
For special types of hermitian symmetric domains and congruence subgroups Γ, algebraic varieties of the form Γ \ X = Sh_{K}(G,X) and their compactifications were introduced in a series of papers of Goro Shimura during the 1960s. Shimura's approach, later presented in his monograph, was largely phenomenological, pursuing the widest generalizations of the reciprocity law formulation of complex multiplication theory. In retrospect, the name "Shimura variety" was introduced by Deligne, who proceeded to isolate the abstract features that played a role in Shimura's theory. In Deligne's formulation, Shimura varieties are parameter spaces of certain types of Hodge structures. Thus they form a natural higher-dimensional generalization of modular curves viewed as moduli spaces of elliptic curves with level structure. In many cases, the moduli problems to which Shimura varieties are solutions have been likewise identified.

== Examples ==
Let F be a totally real number field and D a quaternion division algebra over F. The multiplicative group D^{×} gives rise to a canonical Shimura variety. Its dimension d is the number of infinite places over which D splits. In particular, if d = 1 (for example, if F = Q and D ⊗ R ≅ M_{2}(R)), fixing a sufficiently small arithmetic subgroup of D^{×}, one gets a Shimura curve, and curves arising from this construction are already compact (i.e. projective).

Some examples of Shimura curves with explicitly known equations are given by the Hurwitz curves of low genus:

- Klein quartic (genus 3)
- Macbeath surface (genus 7)
- First Hurwitz triplet (genus 14)

and by the Fermat curve of degree 7.

Other examples of Shimura varieties include Picard modular surfaces and Hilbert modular surfaces, also known as Hilbert–Blumenthal varieties.

== Canonical models and special points ==
Each Shimura variety can be defined over a canonical number field E called the reflex field. This important result due to Shimura shows that Shimura varieties, which a priori are only complex manifolds, have an algebraic field of definition and, therefore, arithmetical significance. It forms the starting point in his formulation of the reciprocity law, where an important role is played by certain arithmetically defined special points.

The qualitative nature of the Zariski closure of sets of special points on a Shimura variety is described by the André–Oort conjecture. Conditional results have been obtained on this conjecture, assuming a generalized Riemann hypothesis.

== Role in the Langlands program ==
Shimura varieties play an outstanding role in the Langlands program. The prototypical theorem, the Eichler–Shimura congruence relation, implies that the Hasse–Weil zeta function of a modular curve is a product of L-functions associated to explicitly determined modular forms of weight 2. Indeed, it was in the process of generalization of this theorem that Goro Shimura introduced his varieties and proved his reciprocity law. Zeta functions of Shimura varieties associated with the group GL_{2} over other number fields and its inner forms (i.e. multiplicative groups of quaternion algebras) were studied by Eichler, Shimura, Kuga, Sato, and Ihara. On the basis of their results, Robert Langlands made a prediction that the Hasse-Weil zeta function of any algebraic variety W defined over a number field would be a product of positive and negative powers of automorphic L-functions, i.e. it should arise from a collection of automorphic representations. However philosophically natural it may be to expect such a description, statements of this type have only been proved when W is a Shimura variety. In the words of Langlands:

To show that all L-functions associated to Shimura varieties – thus to any motive defined by a Shimura variety – can be expressed in terms of the automorphic L-functions of [his paper of 1970] is weaker, even very much weaker, than to show that all motivic L-functions are equal to such L-functions. Moreover, although the stronger statement is expected to be valid, there is, so far as I know, no very compelling reason to expect that all motivic L-functions will be attached to Shimura varieties.
