= Goro Shimura =

Japanese mathematician (1930–2019)

Gorō Shimura
- Goro Shimura in 1964, taken by Princeton University while he was a professor there
- Born: 23 February 1930; Hamamatsu, Japan
- Died: 3 May 2019 (aged 89); Princeton, New Jersey
- Education: University of Tokyo
- Known for: Complex multiplication of abelian varieties Eichler-Shimura relation Modularity theorem Shimura correspondence Shimura variety Shimura subgroup Shimura's reciprocity law
- Awards: Guggenheim Fellowship (1970); Cole Prize (1977); Asahi Prize (1991); Steele Prize (1996)
- Scientific career
- Fields: Mathematics
- Workplaces: Princeton University
- Doctoral students: Don Blasius; Bill Casselman; Melvin Hochster; Kamal Khuri-Makdisi; Robert Rumely; Alice Silverberg

Gorō Shimura (志村 五郎, Shimura Gorō; 23 February 1930 – 3 May 2019) was a Japanese mathematician and Michael Henry Strater Professor Emeritus of Mathematics at Princeton University who worked in number theory, automorphic forms, and arithmetic geometry. He was known for developing the theory of complex multiplication of abelian varieties and Shimura varieties, as well as posing the Taniyama–Shimura conjecture which ultimately led to the proof of Fermat's Last Theorem.

== Biography ==
Gorō Shimura was born in Hamamatsu, Japan, on 23 February 1930. Shimura graduated with a B.A. in mathematics and a D.Sc. in mathematics from the University of Tokyo in 1952 and 1958, respectively.

After graduating, Shimura became a lecturer at the University of Tokyo, then worked abroad — including ten months in Paris and a seven-month stint at Princeton's Institute for Advanced Study — before returning to Tokyo, where he married Chikako Ishiguro. He then moved from Tokyo to join the faculty of Osaka University, but growing unhappy with his funding situation, he decided to seek employment in the United States. Through André Weil he obtained a position at Princeton University. Shimura joined the Princeton faculty in 1964 and retired in 1999, during which time he advised over 28 doctoral students and received the Guggenheim Fellowship in 1970, the Cole Prize for number theory in 1977, the Asahi Prize in 1991, and the Steele Prize for lifetime achievement in 1996.

Shimura described his approach to mathematics as "phenomenological": his interest was in finding new types of interesting behavior in the theory of automorphic forms. He also argued for a "romantic" approach, something he found lacking in the younger generation of mathematicians. Shimura used a two-part process for research, using one desk in his home dedicated to working on new research in the mornings and a second desk for perfecting papers in the afternoon.

Shimura had two children, Tomoko and Haru, with his wife Chikako. Shimura died on 3 May 2019 in Princeton, New Jersey at the age of 89.

== Research ==
Shimura was a colleague and a friend of Yutaka Taniyama, with whom he wrote the first book on the complex multiplication of abelian varieties and formulated the Taniyama–Shimura conjecture. Shimura then wrote a long series of major papers, extending the phenomena found in the theory of complex multiplication of elliptic curves and the theory of modular forms to higher dimensions (e.g. Shimura varieties). This work provided examples for which the equivalence between motivic and automorphic L-functions postulated in the Langlands program could be tested: automorphic forms realized in the cohomology of a Shimura variety have a construction that attaches Galois representations to them.

In 1958, Shimura generalized the initial work of Martin Eichler on the Eichler–Shimura congruence relation between the local L-function of a modular curve and the eigenvalues of Hecke operators. In 1959, Shimura extended the work of Eichler on the Eichler–Shimura isomorphism between Eichler cohomology groups and spaces of cusp forms which would be used in Pierre Deligne's proof of the Weil conjectures.

In 1971, Shimura's work on explicit class field theory in the spirit of Kronecker's Jugendtraum resulted in his proof of Shimura's reciprocity law. In 1973, Shimura established the Shimura correspondence between modular forms of half integral weight k+1/2, and modular forms of even weight 2k.

Shimura's formulation of the Taniyama–Shimura conjecture (later known as the modularity theorem) in the 1950s played a key role in the proof of Fermat's Last Theorem by Andrew Wiles in 1995. In 1990, Kenneth Ribet proved Ribet's theorem which demonstrated that Fermat's Last Theorem followed from the semistable case of this conjecture. Shimura dryly commented that his first reaction on hearing of Andrew Wiles's proof of the semistable case was 'I told you so'.

== Other interests ==
His hobbies were shogi problems of extreme length and collecting Imari porcelain. The Story of Imari: The Symbols and Mysteries of Antique Japanese Porcelain is a non-fiction work about the Imari porcelain that he collected over 30 years that was published by Ten Speed Press in 2008.

== Works ==
=== Mathematical books ===
- Shimura, Goro; Taniyama, Yutaka (1961), Complex multiplication of abelian varieties and its applications to number theory, Publications of the Mathematical Society of Japan, vol. 6, Tokyo: The Mathematical Society of Japan, MR 0125113 Later expanded and published as Shimura (1997)
- Shimura, Goro (1968). Automorphic Functions and Number Theory. Lecture Notes in Mathematics, Vol. 54 (Paperback ed.). Springer. ISBN 978-3-540-04224-2.
- Shimura, Goro (1 August 1971). Introduction to the Arithmetic Theory of Automorphic Functions (Paperback ed.). Princeton University Press. ISBN 978-0-691-08092-5. - It is published from Iwanami Shoten in Japan.
- Shimura, Goro (1 July 1997). Euler Products and Eisenstein Series. CBMS Regional Conference Series in Mathematics (Paperback ed.). American Mathematical Society. ISBN 978-0-8218-0574-9.
- Shimura, Goro (1997). Abelian Varieties with Complex Multiplication and Modular Functions (Hardcover ed.). Princeton University Press. ISBN 978-0-691-01656-6. An expanded version of Shimura & Taniyama (1961).
- Shimura, Goro (22 August 2000). Arithmeticity in the Theory of Automorphic Forms. Mathematical Surveys and Monographs (Paperback ed.). American Mathematical Society. ISBN 978-0-8218-2671-3.
- Shimura, Goro (1 March 2004). Arithmetic and Analytic Theories of Quadratic Forms and Clifford Groups. Mathematical Surveys and Monographs (Hardcover ed.). American Mathematical Society. ISBN 978-0-8218-3573-9.
- Shimura, Goro (2007). Elementary Dirichlet Series and Modular Forms. Springer Monographs in Mathematics (Hardcover ed.). Springer. ISBN 978-0-387-72473-7.
  - Shimura, Goro (28 December 2009). Elementary Dirichlet Series and Modular Forms. Springer Monographs in Mathematics (Paperback ed.). Springer New York. ISBN 978-1-4419-2478-0.
- Shimura, Goro (15 July 2010). Arithmetic of Quadratic Forms. Springer Monographs in Mathematics (Hardcover ed.). Springer. ISBN 978-1-4419-1731-7.

=== Non-fiction ===
- Shimura, Goro (1 June 2008). The Story of Imari: The Symbols and Mysteries of Antique Japanese Porcelain (Hardcover ed.). Ten Speed Press. ISBN 978-1-58008-896-1.
- Shimura, Goro (5 September 2008). The Map of My Life (Hardcover ed.). Berlin: Springer-Verlag. ISBN 978-0-387-79714-4. MR 2442779.
  - Shimura, Goro (28 December 2009). The Map of My Life (Paperback ed.). Springer New York. ISBN 978-1-4419-2724-8.

=== Collected papers ===
- Shimura, Goro (2002). Collected Papers. Vol. I: 1954–1965 (Hardcover ed.). Springer. ISBN 978-0-387-95406-6.
- Shimura, Goro (2002). Collected Papers. Vol. II: 1967–1977 (Hardcover ed.). Springer. ISBN 978-0-387-95416-5.
- Shimura, Goro (2003). Collected Papers. Vol. III: 1978–1988 (Hardcover ed.). Springer. ISBN 978-0-387-95417-2.
- Shimura, Goro (2003). Collected Papers. Vol. IV: 1989–2001 (Hardcover ed.). Springer. ISBN 978-0-387-95418-9.
