= Fricke involution =

In mathematics, a Fricke involution is the involution of the modular curve X_{0}(N) given by τ → –1/Nτ. It is named after Robert Fricke. The Fricke involution also acts on other objects associated with the modular curve, such as spaces of modular forms and the Jacobian J_{0}(N) of the modular curve. The quotient of X_{0}(N) by the Fricke involution is a curve called X_{0}^{+}(N), and for N prime this has genus zero only for a finite list of primes, called supersingular primes, which are the primes that divide the order of the Monster group.

== See also ==
- Atkin–Lehner involution
