= Shimura subgroup =

In mathematics, the Shimura subgroup Σ(N) is a subgroup of the Jacobian of the modular curve X_{0}(N) of level N, given by the kernel of the natural map to the Jacobian of X_{1}(N). It is named after Goro Shimura. There is a similar subgroup Σ(N,D) associated to Shimura curves of quaternion algebras.
