= Ihara's lemma =

On when the kernel of the sum of the two p-degeneracy maps is Eisenstein

In mathematics, Ihara's lemma, introduced by Ihara and named by Ribet, states that the kernel of the sum of the two p-degeneracy maps from J_{0}(N) × J_{0}(N) to J_{0}(Np) is Eisenstein whenever the prime p does not divide N. Here J_{0}(N) is the Jacobian of the compactification of the modular curve of Γ_{0}(N).
