= Multiplicity-one theorem =

Mathematical theorem

In the mathematical theory of automorphic representations, a multiplicity-one theorem is a result about the representation theory of an adelic reductive algebraic group. The multiplicity in question is the number of times a given abstract group representation is realised in a certain space, of square-integrable functions, given in a concrete way.

A multiplicity one theorem may also refer to a result about the restriction of a representation of a group G to a subgroup H. In that context, the pair (G, H) is called a strong Gelfand pair.

== Definition ==
Let G be a reductive algebraic group over a number field K and let A denote the adeles of K. Let Z denote the centre of G and let ω be a continuous unitary character from Z(K)\Z(A)^{×} to C^{×}. Let L^{2}_{0}(G(K)/G(A), ω) denote the space of cusp forms with central character ω on G(A). This space decomposes into a direct sum of Hilbert spaces

$$L^2_0(G(K)\backslash G(\mathbf{A}),\omega)=\widehat{\bigoplus}_{(\pi,V_\pi)}m_\pi V_\pi$$

where the sum is over irreducible subrepresentations and m_{π} are non-negative integers.

The group of adelic points of G, G(A), is said to satisfy the multiplicity-one property if any smooth irreducible admissible representation of G(A) occurs with multiplicity at most one in the space of cusp forms of central character ω, i.e. m_{π} is 0 or 1 for all such π.

== Results ==
The fact that the general linear group, GL(n), has the multiplicity-one property was proved by Jacquet & Langlands (1970) for n = 2 and independently by Piatetski-Shapiro (1979) and Shalika (1974) for n > 2 using the uniqueness of the Whittaker model. Multiplicity-one also holds for SL(2), but not for SL(n) for n > 2 (Blasius 1994).

== Strong multiplicity one theorem ==
The strong multiplicity one theorem of Piatetski-Shapiro (1979) and Jacquet and Shalika (1981a, 1981b) states that two cuspidal automorphic representations of the general linear group are isomorphic if their local components are isomorphic for all but a finite number of places.

== See also ==
- Gan-Gross-Prasad conjecture
