= Hans Petersson =

German mathematician

Hans Petersson (24 September 1902 in Bentschen – 9 November 1984 in Münster) was a German mathematician, known for his research on modular and automorphic forms. He introduced the Petersson inner product and is also known for the Ramanujan–Petersson conjecture.

He received his doctorate in 1925 from the University of Hamburg. His thesis advisor was Erich Hecke.

In a series of papers, Petersson used the Poincaré series to give a complete construction of all meromorphic functions and differentials on a compact Riemann surface.

== See also ==
- Weil–Petersson metric
