= Ramanujan tau function =

Function studied by Ramanujan

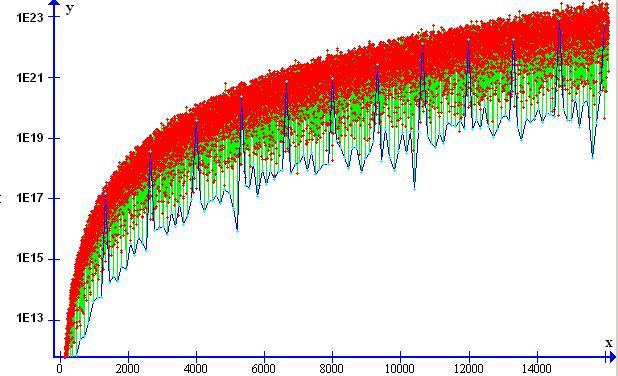
Values of $|\tau(n)|$ for $n<16,000$ with a logarithmic scale. The blue line picks only the values of $n$ that are multiples of 121.

In mathematics, the Ramanujan tau function, studied by Srinivasa Ramanujan, is the function $\tau : \mathbb{N}\to\mathbb{Z}$ defined by

$$\sum_{n=1}^\infty\tau(n)q^n=q\prod_{n=1}^\infty(1-q^n)^{24} = q\phi(q)^{24} = \eta(z)^{24}=\Delta(z),$$

where $\phi$ is the Euler function, $\eta$ is the Dedekind eta function, $\Delta(z)$ is the modular discriminant, and $q=e^{2\pi iz}$ with $\mathrm{Im}(z)>0$.

== Values ==
The first few values of the tau function are given in the following table (sequence A000594 in the OEIS):

$n$	1	2	3	4	5	6	7	8	9	10	11	12	13	14	15	16
$\tau(n)$	1	−24	252	−1472	4830	−6048	−16744	84480	−113643	−115920	534612	−370944	−577738	401856	1217160	987136

Calculating this function on an odd square number yields an odd number, whereas for any other number the function yields an even number.

== Main properties ==
Ramanujan conjectured two properties of $\tau(n)$, which can be rephrased equivalently as:

- $\mathop\tau(mn)=\mathop\tau(m)\mathop\tau(n)$ if $m$ and $n$ are coprime (that is, $\tau(n)$ is a multiplicative function)
- $\tau(p^{r+1})=\mathop\tau(p)\mathop\tau(p^r)-p^{11}\mathop\tau(p^{r-1})$ for $p$ prime and $r>0$.

Together, these two properties are equivalent to the identity

$$\mathop\tau(m) \mathop\tau(n) = \sum_{d|(m,n)}d^{11}\mathop\tau\left(\frac{mn}{d^2}\right),\quad m,n\geq 1.$$

They were proved by Louis Mordell using what is now understood as the theory of Hecke operators. Ramanujan also conjectured the third property
$$|\tau(p)| \le 2 p^{\frac{11}2}$$
for all primes $p$, which is called the Ramanujan conjecture. Assuming the first two properties, Ramanujan noted that his conjecture is equivalent to the inequality

$$|\tau(n)| \le d(n) n^{\frac{11}2}$$

for all $n \ge 1$, where $d(n)$ is the number-of-divisors function. Note that the weaker estimate $\tau(n)=O(n^6)$ is much easier to show. Ramanujan's conjecture was proved by Pierre Deligne in 1974 as a consequence of his proof of the Weil conjectures.

== Ramanujan's L-function ==
Because the modular discriminant $\Delta(z)$ is a cusp form of weight 12, it gives rise to an $L$-function, called Ramanujan's $L$-function. It is defined for $\mathrm{Re}(s)>13/2$ via the Dirichlet series

$$L(s,\Delta)=\sum_{n=1}^\infty\frac{\tau (n)}{n^s},$$

and due to the first two properties of $\tau(n)$ above, it has an Euler product

$$L(s,\Delta)=\prod_{p\,\text{prime}}\frac{1}{1-\tau(p)p^{-s}+p^{11-2s}},$$

valid for $\mathrm{Re}(s)>13/2$. It satisfies the functional equation

$$(2\pi)^{-s}\Gamma(s)L(s,\Delta)=(2\pi)^{-(12-s)}\Gamma(12-s)L(12-s,\Delta),$$

which enables the analytic continuation of $L(s,\Delta)$ to all complex numbers $s$, making it an entire function. Ramanujan conjectured that all nontrivial zeros of $L(s,\Delta)$ have real part equal to $6$. This is a special case of the Grand Riemann hypothesis. Robert Rankin showed that $L(s,\Delta)$ has no zeros on the line $\mathrm{Re}(s)=13/2$.

== Congruences for the tau function ==
For $k\in\mathbb{Z}$ and $n\in\mathbb{N}$, the divisor function $\sigma_k(n)$ is the sum of the $k$th powers of the divisors of $n$. The tau function satisfies several congruence relations; many of them can be expressed in terms of $\sigma_k(n)$. Here are some:

1. $\tau(n)\equiv\sigma_{11}(n) \pmod{2^{11}}\text{ for }n\equiv 1 \pmod{8}$
2. $\tau(n)\equiv 1217 \sigma_{11}(n) \pmod{2^{13}}\text{ for } n\equiv 3 \pmod{8}$
3. $\tau(n)\equiv 1537 \sigma_{11}(n) \pmod{2^{12}}\text{ for }n\equiv 5 \pmod{8}$
4. $\tau(n)\equiv 705 \sigma_{11}(n) \pmod{2^{14}}\text{ for }n\equiv 7 \pmod{8}$
5. $\tau(n)\equiv n^{-610}\sigma_{1231}(n) \pmod{3^{6}}\text{ for }n\equiv 1 \pmod{3}$
6. $\tau(n)\equiv n^{-610}\sigma_{1231}(n) \pmod{3^{7}}\text{ for }n\equiv 2 \pmod{3}$
7. $\tau(n)\equiv n^{-30}\sigma_{71}(n) \pmod{5^{3}}\text{ for }n\not\equiv 0 \pmod{5}$
8. $\tau(n)\equiv n\sigma_{9}(n) \pmod{7}$
9. $\tau(n)\equiv n\sigma_{9}(n) \pmod{7^2}\text{ for }n\equiv 3,5,6 \pmod{7}$
10. $\tau(n)\equiv\sigma_{11}(n) \pmod{691}.$

For primes $p\neq 23$, we have

11. $\tau(p)\equiv 0 \pmod{23}\text{ if }\left(\frac{p}{23}\right)=-1$
12. $\tau(p)\equiv \sigma_{11}(p) \pmod{23^2}$ if $p$ is of the form $a^2+23 b^2$
13. $\tau(p)\equiv -1 \pmod{23}\text{ otherwise}.$

== Explicit formulas ==
In 1972, Ian G. Macdonald proved an explicit formula for the Ramanujan tau function
$$\tau(n)
=
\frac{1}{1!\,2!\,3!\,4!}
\sum_{
\begin{smallmatrix}
x_1+x_2+x_3+x_4+x_5=0\\
x_1^2+x_2^2+x_3^2+x_4^2+x_5^2=10n\\
x_i\equiv i \pmod 5,\; i=1,\dots,5
\end{smallmatrix}
}
\prod_{1\le i<j\le 5}(x_i-x_j).$$
In 1975, Douglas Niebur proved the formula

$$\tau(n)=n^4\sigma(n)-24\sum_{i=1}^{n-1}i^2(35i^2-52in+18n^2)\sigma(i)\sigma(n-i),$$

where $\sigma(n)$ is the sum-of-divisor function.

== Conjectures on the tau function ==
Suppose that $f$ is a weight-$k$ integer newform whose Fourier coefficients $a(n)$ are integers. Consider the problem:

Given that $f$ does not have complex multiplication, do almost all primes $p$ have the property that $a(p)\not\equiv 0\pmod{p}$ ?

Indeed, most primes should have this property, and hence they are called ordinary. Despite the big advances by Deligne and Serre on Galois representations, which determine $a(n)\pmod{p}$ for $n$ coprime to $p$, it is unclear how to compute $a(p)\pmod{p}$. The only theorem in this regard is Elkies' famous result for modular elliptic curves, which guarantees that there are infinitely many primes $p$ such that $a(p)=0$, which thus are congruent to 0 modulo $p$. There are no known examples of non-CM $f$ with weight greater than 2 for which $a(p)\not\equiv 0\pmod{p}$ for infinitely many primes $p$ (although it should be true for almost all $p$. There are also no known examples with $a(p)\equiv 0 \pmod{p}$ for infinitely many $p$. Some researchers had begun to doubt whether $a(p)\equiv 0 \pmod{p}$ for infinitely many $p$. As evidence, many provided Ramanujan's $\tau(p)$ (case of weight 12). The only solutions up to $10^{10}$ to the equation $\tau(p)\equiv 0\pmod{p}$ are 2, 3, 5, 7, 2411, and 7758337633 (sequence A007659 in the OEIS).

Lehmer (1947) conjectured that $\tau(n)\neq 0$ for all $n$, an assertion sometimes known as Lehmer's conjecture. Lehmer verified the conjecture for $n$ up to 214928639999 (Apostol 1997, p. 22). The following table summarizes progress on finding successively larger values of $N$ for which this condition holds for all $n\leq N$.

$N$	reference
3316799	Lehmer (1947)
214928639999	Lehmer (1949)
1000000000000000	Serre (1973, p. 98), Serre (1985)
1213229187071998	Jennings (1993)
22689242781695999	Jordan and Kelly (1999)
22798241520242687999	Bosman (2007)
982149821766199295999	Zeng and Yin (2013)
816212624008487344127999	Derickx, van Hoeij, and Zeng (2013)
