= Eigenform =

In mathematics, an eigenform (meaning simultaneous Hecke eigenform with modular group SL(2,Z)) is a modular form that is an eigenvector for all Hecke operators T_{m}, m = 1, 2, 3, ....

Eigenforms fall into the realm of number theory, but can be found in other areas of math and science such as analysis, combinatorics, and physics. Common examples of eigenforms, and the only non-cuspidal eigenforms, are those of the Eisenstein series. Another example is the Δ function.

== Normalization ==
There are two different normalizations for an eigenform (or for a modular form in general).

=== Algebraic normalization ===
An eigenform is said to be normalized when scaled so that the q-coefficient in its Fourier series is one:

$$f = a_0 + q + \sum_{i=2}^\infty a_i q^i$$

where q = e^{2πiz}. As the function f is also an eigenvector under each Hecke operator T_{i}, it has a corresponding eigenvalue. More specifically a_{i}, i ≥ 1 turns out to be the eigenvalue of f corresponding to the Hecke operator T_{i}. In the case when f is not a cusp form, the eigenvalues can be given explicitly.

=== Analytic normalization ===
An eigenform which is cuspidal can be normalized with respect to its inner product:

$$\langle f, f \rangle = 1\,$$

== Existence ==
The existence of eigenforms is a nontrivial result, but does come directly from the fact that the Hecke algebra is commutative.

== Higher levels ==
In the case that the modular group is not the full SL(2,Z), there is not a Hecke operator for each n ∈ Z, and as such the definition of an eigenform is changed accordingly: an eigenform is a modular form which is a simultaneous eigenvector for all Hecke operators that act on the space.
