= Martin Eichler =

German mathematician (1912–1992)

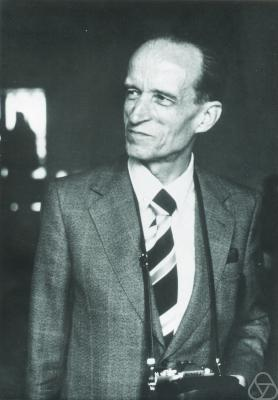
- Martin Eichler
- Born: 29 March 1912
- Died: 7 October 1992 (aged 80)
- Scientific career
- Fields: Number theory and Mathematics

Martin Maximilian Emil Eichler (29 March 1912 – 7 October 1992) was a German mathematician.

Eichler received his Ph.D. from the Martin Luther University of Halle-Wittenberg in 1936.

Eichler and Goro Shimura developed a method to construct elliptic curves from certain modular forms. The converse notion that every elliptic curve has a corresponding modular form would later be the key to the proof of Fermat's Last Theorem.

== Selected publications ==
- Quadratische Formen und orthogonale Gruppen, Springer 1952, 1974
- Lectures on Modular Correspondences. Tata Institute. 1955; pbk, 169 pages
- Einführung in die Theorie der algebraischen Zahlen und Funktionen, Birkhäuser 1963; Eng. trans. 1966, Introduction to the theory of algebraic numbers and functions, in which a section on modular forms is added; pbk 2014 reprint of 1963 German original
- Projective varieties and modular forms 1971 (Riemann–Roch theorem); Eichler, M. (15 November 2006). 2006 edition. Springer. ISBN 9783540368694.
- with Don Zagier: The Theory of Jacobi forms, Birkhäuser 1985; Eichler, Martin; Zagier, Don (14 December 2013). 2013 edition. Springer. ISBN 9781468491623.
- ''Über die Einheiten der Divisionsalgebren'', Mathem. Annalen 1937
- ''Neuere Ergebnisse der Theorie der einfachen Algebren'', Jahresbericht DMV 1937
- Allgemeine Integration linearer partieller Differentialgleichungen von elliptischem Typ bei zwei Grundvariablen, Abh. Math. Sem. Univ. Hamburg 15 (1947), 179–210. MR 0029054
- On the differential equation u_{xx} + u_{yy} + N(x)u = 0, Trans. Amer. Math. Soc. 65 (1949), 259–278 doi:10.1090/S0002-9947-1949-0029055-8
- ''Zur Algebra der orthogonalen Gruppen'' Mathem. Zeitschrift 1950
- Zahlentheorie der Quaternionenalgebren, Crelle J. vol. 195, 1955, with errata
- Quaternäre quadratische Formen und die Riemannsche Vermutung für die Kongruenz-Zetafunktion, Archiv Math. vol. 5, 1954, pp. 355–366 (Ramanujan–Petersson conjecture)
- ''Eine Verallgemeinerung der Abelschen Integrale'', Math. Zeitschrift vol. 67, 1957, pp. 267-298
- Quadratische Formen und Modulfunktionen Acta Arithmetica vol. 4, 1958, pp. 217–239
- Eine Vorbereitung auf den Riemann-Rochschen Satz für algebraische Funktionenkörper, Crelle J. 1964
- ''Einige Anwendungen der Spurformel im Bereich der Modularkorrespondenzen'', Mathem. Annalen 1967, (Eichler–Shimura theory)
- Eichler ''Eine Spurformel von Korrespondenzen von algebraischen Funktionenkörpern mit sich selber'', Inv. Math. vol. 2, 1967 with corrections
- The basis problem for modular forms and the traces of the Hecke operators, Springer, Lecture notes Math. vol.320, 1973, pp. 75–152

== See also ==
- Eichler–Shimura congruence relation
- Eichler–Shimura isomorphism
- Eichler cohomology
- Eichler order
- Eichler's proof of the BCH theorem
