= Automorphic function =

Mathematical function on a space that is invariant under the action of some group

In mathematics, an automorphic function is a function on a space that is invariant under the action of some group, in other words a function on the quotient space. Often the space is a complex manifold and the group is a discrete group.

== Factor of automorphy ==
In mathematics, the notion of factor of automorphy arises for a group acting on a complex-analytic manifold. Suppose a group $G$ acts on a complex-analytic manifold $X$. Then, $G$ also acts on the space of holomorphic functions from $X$ to the complex numbers. A function $f$ is termed an automorphic form if the following holds:

$$f(g.x) = j_g(x)f(x)$$

where $j_g(x)$ is an everywhere nonzero holomorphic function. Equivalently, an automorphic form is a function whose divisor is invariant under the action of $G$.

The factor of automorphy for the automorphic form $f$ is the function $j$. An automorphic function is an automorphic form for which $j$ is the identity.

Some facts about factors of automorphy:

- Every factor of automorphy is a cocycle for the action of $G$ on the multiplicative group of everywhere nonzero holomorphic functions.
- The factor of automorphy is a coboundary if and only if it arises from an everywhere nonzero automorphic form.
- For a given factor of automorphy, the space of automorphic forms is a vector space.
- The pointwise product of two automorphic forms is an automorphic form corresponding to the product of the corresponding factors of automorphy.

Relation between factors of automorphy and other notions:

- Let $\Gamma$ be a lattice in a Lie group $G$. Then, a factor of automorphy for $\Gamma$ corresponds to a line bundle on the quotient group $G/\Gamma$. Further, the automorphic forms for a given factor of automorphy correspond to sections of the corresponding line bundle.

The case of $G$ a subgroup of $SL_2(\mathbb{R})$, acting on the upper half-plane, is treated in the article on automorphic factors. In particular, automorphic functions for the modular group $G=SL_2(\mathbb{Z})$ are called modular functions.
