= Eichler–Shimura congruence relation =

Theorem in number theory

In number theory, the Eichler–Shimura congruence relation expresses the local L-function of a modular curve at a prime p in terms of the eigenvalues of Hecke operators. It was introduced by Eichler (1954) and generalized by Shimura (1958). Roughly speaking, it says that the correspondence on the modular curve inducing the Hecke operator T_{p} is congruent mod p to the sum of the Frobenius map Frob and its transpose Ver. In other words,

T_{p} = Frob + Ver

as endomorphisms of the Jacobian J_{0}(N)_{F_{p}} of the modular curve X_{0}(N) over the finite field F_{p}.

The Eichler–Shimura congruence relation and its generalizations to Shimura varieties play a pivotal role in the Langlands program, by identifying a part of the Hasse–Weil zeta function of a modular curve or a more general modular variety, with the product of Mellin transforms of weight 2 modular forms or a product of analogous automorphic L-functions.
