= Shimura's reciprocity law =

On the action of ideles of imaginary quadratic fields on the values of modular functions

In mathematics, Shimura's reciprocity law, introduced by Shimura (1971), describes the action of ideles of imaginary quadratic fields on the values of modular functions at singular moduli. It forms a part of the Kronecker Jugendtraum, explicit class field theory for such fields. There are also higher-dimensional generalizations.
