= Complex multiplication of abelian varieties =

In mathematics, an abelian variety A defined over a field K is said to have CM-type if it has a large enough commutative subring in its endomorphism ring End(A). The terminology here is from complex multiplication theory, which was developed for elliptic curves in the nineteenth century. One of the major achievements in algebraic number theory and algebraic geometry of the twentieth century was to find the correct formulations of the corresponding theory for abelian varieties of dimension d > 1. The problem is at a deeper level of abstraction, because it is much harder to manipulate analytic functions of several complex variables.

The formal definition is that

$$\operatorname{End}_\mathbb{Q}(A)$$

the tensor product of End(A) with the rational number field Q, should contain a commutative subring of dimension 2d over Q. When d = 1 this can only be a quadratic field, and one recovers the cases where End(A) is an order in an imaginary quadratic field. For d > 1 there are comparable cases for CM-fields, the complex quadratic extensions of totally real fields. There are other cases that reflect that A may not be a simple abelian variety (it might be a cartesian product of elliptic curves, for example). Another name for abelian varieties of CM-type is abelian varieties with sufficiently many complex multiplications.

It is known that if K is the complex numbers, then any such A has a field of definition which is in fact a number field. The possible types of endomorphism ring have been classified, as rings with involution (the Rosati involution), leading to a classification of CM-type abelian varieties. To construct such varieties in the same style as for elliptic curves, starting with a lattice Λ in C^{d}, one must take into account the Riemann relations of abelian variety theory.

The CM-type is a description of the action of a (maximal) commutative subring L of End_{Q}(A) on the holomorphic tangent space of A at the identity element. Spectral theory of a simple kind applies, to show that L acts via a basis of eigenvectors; in other words L has an action that is via diagonal matrices on the holomorphic vector fields on A. In the simple case, where L is itself a number field rather than a product of some number of fields, the CM-type is then a list of complex embeddings of L. There are 2d of those, occurring in complex conjugate pairs; the CM-type is a choice of one out of each pair. It is known that all such possible CM-types can be realised.

Basic results of Goro Shimura and Yutaka Taniyama compute the Hasse–Weil L-function of A, in terms of the CM-type and a Hecke L-function with Hecke character, having infinity-type derived from it. These generalise the results of Max Deuring for the elliptic curve case.

== Sources ==
- Lang, Serge (1983), Complex Multiplication, Springer Verlag, ISBN 0-387-90786-6
