= Ground field =

In mathematics, a ground field is a field K (often 𝕂 or $\mathbb{K}$) fixed at the beginning of a discussion.

== Use ==
Ground fields are used in the construction of a variety of algebraic objects.

=== In linear algebra ===
In linear algebra, the concept of a vector space may be developed over any field.

=== In algebraic geometry ===
In algebraic geometry, in the foundational developments of André Weil the use of fields other than the complex numbers was essential to expand the definitions to include the idea of abstract algebraic variety over K, and generic point relative to K.

=== In Lie theory ===
Reference to a ground field may be common in the theory of Lie algebras (qua vector spaces) and algebraic groups (qua algebraic varieties).

=== In Galois theory ===
In Galois theory, given a field extension L/K, the field K that is being extended may be considered the ground field for an argument or discussion. Within algebraic geometry, from the point of view of scheme theory, the spectrum Spec(K) of the ground field K plays the role of final object in the category of K-schemes, and its structure and symmetry may be richer than the fact that the space of the scheme is a point might suggest.

=== In Diophantine geometry ===
In diophantine geometry the characteristic problems of the subject are those caused by the fact that the ground field K is not taken to be algebraically closed. The field of definition of a variety given abstractly may be smaller than the ground field, and two varieties may become isomorphic when the ground field is enlarged, a major topic in Galois cohomology.
