= Weil–Petersson metric =

Mathematical metric for Riemann surfaces

In mathematics, the Weil–Petersson metric is a Kähler metric on the Teichmüller space T_{g,n} of genus g Riemann surfaces with n marked points. It was introduced by André Weil (1958, 1979) using the Petersson inner product on forms on a Riemann surface (introduced by Hans Petersson).

== Definition ==
If a point of Teichmüller space is represented by a Riemann surface R, then the cotangent space at that point can be identified with the space of quadratic differentials at R. Since the Riemann surface has a natural hyperbolic metric, at least if it has negative Euler characteristic, one can define a Hermitian inner product on the space of quadratic differentials by integrating over the Riemann surface. This induces a Hermitian inner product on the tangent space to each point of Teichmüller space, and hence a Riemannian metric.

== Properties ==
Weil (1958) stated, and Ahlfors (1961) proved, that the Weil–Petersson metric is a Kähler metric. Ahlfors (1961b) proved that it has negative holomorphic sectional, scalar, and Ricci curvatures. The Weil–Petersson metric is usually not complete.

== Generalizations ==
The Weil–Petersson metric can be defined in a similar way for some moduli spaces of higher-dimensional varieties.

== See also ==
- Ramanujan–Petersson conjecture
