= Shimura correspondence =

In number theory, the Shimura correspondence is a correspondence between modular forms F of half integral weight k+1/2, and modular forms f of even weight 2k, discovered by Goro Shimura (1973). It has the property that the eigenvalue of a Hecke operator T_{n^{2}} on F is equal to the eigenvalue of T_{n} on f.

Let $f$ be a holomorphic cusp form with weight $(2k+1)/2$ and character $\chi$ . For any prime number p, let

$$\sum^\infty_{n=1}\Lambda(n)n^{-s}=\prod_p(1-\omega_pp^{-s}+(\chi_p)^2p^{2k-1-2s})^{-1}\ ,$$

where $\omega_p$'s are the eigenvalues of the Hecke operators $T(p^2)$ determined by p.

Using the functional equation of L-function, Shimura showed that

$$F(z)=\sum^\infty_{n=1} \Lambda(n)q^n$$

is a holomorphic modular function with weight 2k and character $\chi^2$ .

Shimura's proof uses the Rankin-Selberg convolution of $f(z)$ with the theta series $\theta_\psi(z)=\sum_{n=-\infty}^\infty \psi(n) n^\nu e^{2i \pi n^2 z} \ ({\scriptstyle\nu = \frac{1-\psi(-1)}{2}})$ for various Dirichlet characters $\psi$ then applies Weil's converse theorem.

== See also ==
- Theta correspondence
