= Don Blasius =

American mathematician

Don Malcolm Blasius (born 5 September 1950 in Paterson, New Jersey) is an American mathematician.

== Education and career ==
Blasius graduated from Harvard University in 1972 with a bachelor's degree and from the University of Oxford in 1977 with a bachelor's degree. He received his PhD in 1981 from Princeton University with thesis Arithmetic of Monomial Relations between the Periods of Abelian Varieties under the supervision of Gorō Shimura. Blasius was an assistant professor from 1981 to 1985 at Columbia University and from 1985 to 1987 at Yale University. He became in 1987 an associate professor at City University of New York and in 1989 a full professor at UCLA.

His research deals with number theory, arithmetic geometry, and automorphic forms, in particular, Hilbert modular forms and zeta functions of Shimura varieties.

He was a visiting professor at the École normale supérieure in 1989, at the Max Planck Institute in Bonn, and at the Isaac Newton Institute.

He is on the editorial staff of the Pacific Journal of Mathematics. In 1981 and 1989/90 he was a member of the Institute for Advanced Study. He was elected a fellow of the American Mathematical Society (Class of 2018).

== Selected publications ==
- "On the critical values of Hecke L-series", Annals of Mathematics, vol. 124, 1986, pp. 23–63
- with Jonathan Rogawski: "Galois representations for Hilbert modular forms". Bull. Amer. Math. Soc. (N.S.), vol. 21, 1989, pp. 65–69.
- with J. Rogawski: "Motives for Hilbert modular forms", Inv. Math., vol. 114, 1993, pp. 55–89
- with J. Rogawski: "Zeta functions of Shimura varieties", in U. Jannsen, S. Kleiman, J.-P. Serre (eds.), Motives, Proc. Symp. Pure Math., vol. 55, II, AMS 1994, pp. 525–571
- with Michael Harris and Dinakar Ramakrishnan: "Coherent cohomology, limits of discrete series, and Galois conjugation", Duke Math. J., vol. 73, 1994, pp. 647–685
- with M. Borovoi: "On Period Torsors, in: Automorphic forms, automorphic representations, and arithmetic", Proc. Symp. Pure Math. 66, AMS 1999
- "Hilbert modular forms, elliptic curves and the Hodge Conjecture", in H. Hida, D. Ramakrishnan, F. Shahidi (eds.), Contributions to Automorphic Forms, Geometry, and Number Theory, Johns Hopkins University Press 2004
- "Hilbert modular forms and the Ramanujan conjecture", in: C. Consani, M. Marcolli (eds.), Noncommutative Geometry and Number Theory, Aspects of Mathematics, Vieweg/Teubner, 2006, pp. 35–56, arXiv preprint
