= Selberg's 1/4 conjecture =

Mathematical conjecture about eigenvalues

In mathematics, Selberg's conjecture, also known as Selberg's eigenvalue conjecture, conjectured by Selberg (1965, p. 13), states that the eigenvalues of the Laplace operator on Maass wave forms of congruence subgroups are at least 1/4. Selberg showed that the eigenvalues are at least 3/16. Subsequent works improved the bound, and the best bound currently known is 975/4096≈0.238..., due to Kim & Sarnak (2003).

The generalized Ramanujan conjecture for the general linear group implies Selberg's conjecture. More precisely, Selberg's conjecture is essentially the generalized Ramanujan conjecture for the group GL_{2} over the rationals at the infinite place, and says that the component at infinity of the corresponding representation is a principal series representation of GL_{2}(R) (rather than a complementary series representation). The generalized Ramanujan conjecture in turn follows from the Langlands functoriality conjecture, and this has led to some progress on Selberg's conjecture.
