= Automorphic factor =

In mathematics, an automorphic factor is a certain type of analytic function, defined on subgroups of SL(2,R), appearing in the theory of modular forms. The general case, for general groups, is reviewed in the article 'factor of automorphy'.

== Definition ==
An automorphic factor of weight k is a function
$$\nu : \Gamma \times \mathbb{H} \to \Complex$$
satisfying the four properties given below. Here, the notation $\mathbb{H}$ and $\Complex$ refer to the upper half-plane and the complex plane, respectively. The notation $\Gamma$ is a subgroup of SL(2,R), such as, for example, a Fuchsian group. An element $\gamma \in \Gamma$ is a 2×2 matrix
$$\gamma = \begin{bmatrix}a&b \\c & d\end{bmatrix}$$
with a, b, c, d real numbers, satisfying ad−bc=1.

An automorphic factor must satisfy:

1. For a fixed $\gamma\in\Gamma$, the function $\nu(\gamma,z)$ is a holomorphic function of $z\in\mathbb{H}$.
2. For all $z\in\mathbb{H}$ and $\gamma\in\Gamma$, one has
  $$\vert\nu(\gamma,z)\vert = \vert cz + d\vert^k$$
  for a fixed real number k.
3. For all $z\in\mathbb{H}$ and $\gamma,\delta \in \Gamma$, one has
  $$\nu(\gamma\delta, z) = \nu(\gamma,\delta z)\nu(\delta,z)$$
  Here, $\delta z$ is the fractional linear transform of $z$ by $\delta$.
4. If $-I\in\Gamma$, then for all $z\in\mathbb{H}$ and $\gamma \in \Gamma$, one has
  $$\nu(-\gamma,z) = \nu(\gamma,z)$$
  Here, I denotes the identity matrix.

== Properties ==
Every automorphic factor may be written as

$$\nu(\gamma, z)=\upsilon(\gamma) (cz+d)^k$$

with

$$\vert\upsilon(\gamma)\vert = 1$$

The function $\upsilon:\Gamma\to S^1$ is called a multiplier system. Clearly,

$$\upsilon(I)=1$$,

while, if $-I\in\Gamma$, then

$$\upsilon(-I)=e^{-i\pi k}$$

which equals $(-1)^k$ when k is an integer.

== Complex generalization ==
There exist non-holomorphic automorphic factors of the type

$$\nu(\gamma, z)=\upsilon(\gamma) (cz+d)^\alpha (c\bar z+d)^\beta$$

where $\alpha,\beta\in\mathbb{C}$ are arbitrary coweights. The condition
$$\nu(\gamma\delta, z) = \nu(\gamma,\delta z)\nu(\delta,z)$$
reduces to $\upsilon(\gamma\delta)=\upsilon(\gamma)\upsilon(\delta)$ if $\alpha-\beta\in\mathbb{Z}$.

If $\Gamma=SL_2(\mathbb{Z})$ is the modular group and $\Re\alpha,\Re\beta\in [0,1)$, then there exists a multiplier system such that

$$\upsilon\left(\begin{smallmatrix} 1 & 1 \\ 0 & 1 \end{smallmatrix}\right) = e^{i\frac{\pi}{6}(\alpha-\beta)}
\quad , \quad \upsilon\left(\begin{smallmatrix} 0 & -1 \\ 1 & 0 \end{smallmatrix}\right) = e^{-i\frac{\pi}{2}(\alpha-\beta)}$$

For $\eta(z)$ the Dedekind eta function, the modular form $f_{\alpha,\beta}(z)=\eta(z)^{2\alpha}\overline{\eta(z)^{2\overline{\beta}}}$ is such that $f_{\alpha,\beta}(\gamma(z)) = \nu(\gamma,z)f_{\alpha,\beta}(z)$ for any $\gamma\in SL_2(\mathbb{Z})$.
