= Q-expansion principle =

In mathematics, the q-expansion principle states that a modular form f has coefficients in a module M if its q-expansion at enough cusps resembles the q-expansion of a modular form g with coefficients in M. It was introduced by Katz (1973, corollaries 1.6.2, 1.12.2).
