= Eichler order =

In mathematics, an Eichler order, named after Martin Eichler, is an order of a quaternion algebra that is the intersection of two maximal orders.
