= Motivic L-function =

In mathematics, motivic L-functions are a generalization of Hasse–Weil L-functions to general motives over global fields. The local L-factor at a finite place v is similarly given by the characteristic polynomial of a Frobenius element at v acting on the v-inertial invariants of the v-adic realization of the motive. For infinite places, Jean-Pierre Serre gave a recipe in (Serre 1970) for the so-called Gamma factors in terms of the Hodge realization of the motive. It is conjectured that, like other L-functions, that each motivic L-function can be analytically continued to a meromorphic function on the entire complex plane and satisfies a functional equation relating the L-function L(s, M) of a motive M to L(1 − s, M^{∨}), where M^{∨} is the dual of the motive M.

== Examples ==
Basic examples include Artin L-functions and Hasse–Weil L-functions. It is also known (Scholl 1990), for example, that a motive can be attached to a newform (i.e. a primitive cusp form), hence their L-functions are motivic.

== Conjectures ==
Several conjectures exist concerning motivic L-functions. It is believed that motivic L-functions should all arise as automorphic L-functions, and hence should be part of the Selberg class. There are also conjectures concerning the values of these L-functions at integers generalizing those known for the Riemann zeta function, such as Deligne's conjecture on special values of L-functions, the Beilinson conjecture, and the Bloch–Kato conjecture (on special values of L-functions).
