= Eichler–Shimura isomorphism =

Cohomology theory

In mathematics, Eichler cohomology (also called parabolic cohomology or cuspidal cohomology) is a cohomology theory for Fuchsian groups, introduced by Eichler (1957), that is a variation of group cohomology analogous to the image of the cohomology with compact support in the ordinary cohomology group. The Eichler–Shimura isomorphism, introduced by Eichler for complex cohomology and by Shimura (1959) for real cohomology, is an isomorphism between an Eichler cohomology group and a space of cusp forms. There are several variations of the Eichler–Shimura isomorphism, because one can use either real or complex coefficients, and can also use either Eichler cohomology or ordinary group cohomology as in (Gunning 1961). There is also a variation of the Eichler–Shimura isomorphisms using l-adic cohomology instead of real cohomology, which relates the coefficients of cusp forms to eigenvalues of Frobenius acting on these groups. Deligne (1971) used this to reduce the Ramanujan conjecture to the Weil conjectures that he later proved.

== Eichler cohomology ==
If G is a Fuchsian group and M is a representation of it then the Eichler cohomology group H^{1}_{P}(G,M) is defined to be the kernel of the map from H^{1}(G,M) to Π_{c} H^{1}(G_{c},M), where the product is over the cusps c of a fundamental domain of G, and G_{c} is the subgroup fixing the cusp c.

The Eichler–Shimura isomorphism is an isomorphism between the space of cusp forms on G of weight n + 2 and the first Eichler cohomology of the group G with the coefficients in the G-module $X_n$, where the rank of $X_n$ depends on n.
