= Petersson inner product =

In mathematics the Petersson inner product is an inner product defined on the space of entire modular forms. It was introduced by the German mathematician Hans Petersson.

== Definition ==
Let $\mathbb{M}_k$ be the space of entire modular forms of weight $k$ and $\mathbb{S}_k$ the space of cusp forms.

The mapping $\langle \cdot , \cdot \rangle : \mathbb{M}_k \times \mathbb{S}_k \rightarrow \mathbb{C}$,

$$\langle f , g \rangle := \int_\mathrm{F} f(\tau) \overline{g(\tau)}
(\operatorname{Im}\tau)^k d\nu (\tau)$$

is called Petersson inner product, where

$$\mathrm{F} = \left\{ \tau \in \mathrm{H} : \left| \operatorname{Re}\tau \right| \leq \frac{1}{2},
\left| \tau \right| \geq 1 \right\}$$

is a fundamental region of the modular group $\Gamma$ and for $\tau = x + iy$

$$d\nu(\tau) = y^{-2}dxdy$$

is the hyperbolic volume form.

== Properties ==
The integral is absolutely convergent and the Petersson inner product is a positive definite Hermitian form.

For the Hecke operators $T_n$, and for forms $f,g$ of level $\Gamma_0$, we have:

$$\langle T_n f , g \rangle = \langle f , T_n g \rangle,$$

i.e., the $T_n$ are self-adjoint with respect to the Petersson inner product. This can be used to show that the space of cusp forms of level $\Gamma_0$ has an orthonormal basis consisting of simultaneous eigenfunctions for the Hecke operators and the Fourier coefficients of these forms are all real.

== See also ==
- Weil–Petersson metric
