= Congruence subgroup =

Matrix group

In mathematics, a congruence subgroup of a matrix group with integer entries is a subgroup defined by congruence conditions on the entries. A very simple example is the subgroup of invertible 2 × 2 integer matrices of determinant 1 in which the off-diagonal entries are even. More generally, the notion of congruence subgroup can be defined for arithmetic subgroups of algebraic groups; that is, those for which we have a notion of 'integral structure' and can define reduction maps modulo an integer.

The existence of congruence subgroups in an arithmetic group provides it with a wealth of subgroups, in particular it shows that the group is residually finite. An important question regarding the algebraic structure of arithmetic groups is the congruence subgroup problem, which asks whether all subgroups of finite index are essentially congruence subgroups.

Congruence subgroups of 2 × 2 matrices are fundamental objects in the classical theory of modular forms; the modern theory of automorphic forms makes a similar use of congruence subgroups in more general arithmetic groups.

== Congruence subgroups of the modular group ==
The simplest interesting setting in which congruence subgroups can be studied is that of the modular group $\mathrm{SL}_2(\Z)$.

=== Principal congruence subgroups ===
If $n \geqslant 1$ is an integer, there is a homomorphism $\pi_n: \mathrm{SL}_2(\Z) \to \mathrm{SL}_2(\Z /n\Z)$ induced by the reduction modulo $n$ morphism $\Z \to \Z / n\Z$. The principal congruence subgroup of level $n$ in $\Gamma = \mathrm{SL}_2(\Z)$ is the kernel of $\pi_n$, and it is usually denoted $\Gamma(n)$. Explicitly it is described as follows:

$$\Gamma(n) = \left\{ \begin{pmatrix} a & b \\ c & d \end{pmatrix} \in \mathrm{SL}_2(\Z) : a, d \equiv 1 \pmod n, \quad b, c \equiv 0 \pmod n \right\}$$

This definition immediately implies that $\Gamma(n)$ is a normal subgroup of finite index in $\Gamma$. The strong approximation theorem (in this case an easy consequence of the Chinese remainder theorem) implies that $\pi_n$ is surjective, so that the quotient $\Gamma /\Gamma(n)$ is isomorphic to $\mathrm{SL}_2(\Z/n\Z)$. Computing the order of this finite group yields the following formula for the index:

$$[\Gamma : \Gamma(n)] = n^3 \cdot \prod_{p \mid n} \left( 1 - \frac 1 {p^2} \right)$$

where the product is taken over all prime numbers dividing $n$.

If $n \geqslant 3$ then the restriction of $\pi_n$ to any finite subgroup of $\Gamma$ is injective. This implies the following result:

If $n\geqslant 3$ then the principal congruence subgroups $\Gamma(n)$ are torsion-free.

The group $\Gamma(2)$ contains $-\operatorname{Id}$ and is not torsion-free. On the other hand, its image in $\operatorname{PSL}_2(\Z)$ is torsion-free, and the quotient of the hyperbolic plane by this subgroup is a sphere with three cusps.

=== Definition of a congruence subgroup ===
A subgroup $H$ in $\Gamma = \mathrm{SL}_2(\Z)$ is called a congruence subgroup if there exists $n \geqslant 1$ such that $H$ contains the principal congruence subgroup $\Gamma(n)$. The level $l$ of $H$ is then the smallest such $n$(The level is not needed to be the smallest).

From this definition it follows that:

- Congruence subgroups are of finite index in $\Gamma$;
- The congruence subgroups of level $\ell$ are in one-to-one correspondence with the subgroups of $\operatorname{SL}_2(\Z/\ell\Z )$.

=== Examples ===
The subgroup $\Gamma_0(n)$, sometimes called the Hecke congruence subgroup of level $n$, is defined as the preimage by $\pi_n$ of the group of upper triangular matrices. That is,

$$\Gamma_0(n) = \left\{ \begin{pmatrix} a & b \\ c & d \end{pmatrix} \in \Gamma : c \equiv 0 \pmod n \right\}.$$

The index is given by the formula:

$$[\Gamma : \Gamma_0(n)] = n \cdot \prod_{p | n} \left( 1 + \frac 1 p \right)$$

where the product is taken over all prime numbers dividing $n$. If $p$ is prime then $\Gamma/\Gamma_0(p)$ is in natural bijection with the projective line over the finite field $\mathbb F_p$, and explicit representatives for the (left or right) cosets of $\Gamma_0(p)$ in $\Gamma$ are the following matrices:

$$\operatorname{Id}, \begin{pmatrix} 1 & 0 \\ 1 & 1 \end{pmatrix}, \ldots, \begin{pmatrix} 1 & 0 \\ p-1 & 1 \end{pmatrix}, \begin{pmatrix} 0 & -1 \\ 1 & 0 \end{pmatrix}.$$

The subgroups $\Gamma_0(n)$ are never torsion-free as they always contain the matrix $-I$. There are infinitely many $n$ such that the image of $\Gamma_0(n)$ in $\mathrm{PSL}_2(\Z )$ also contains torsion elements.

The subgroup $\Gamma_1(n)$ is the preimage of the subgroup of unipotent matrices:

$$\Gamma_1(n) = \left\{ \begin{pmatrix} a & b \\ c & d \end{pmatrix} \in \Gamma : a, d \equiv 1 \pmod n, c \equiv 0 \pmod n \right\}.$$

Their indices are given by the formula:

$$[\Gamma : \Gamma_1(n)] = n^2 \cdot \prod_{p | n} \left( 1 - \frac 1 {p^2} \right)$$

The theta subgroup $\Lambda$ is the congruence subgroup of $\Gamma$ defined as the preimage of the cyclic group of order two generated by $\left ( \begin{smallmatrix} 0 & -1 \\1 & 0 \end{smallmatrix} \right ) \in \mathrm{SL}_2(\Z/2\Z )$. It is of index 3 and is explicitly described by:

$$\Lambda = \left\{ \begin{pmatrix} a & b \\ c & d \end{pmatrix} \in \Gamma : ac \equiv 0 \pmod 2, bd \equiv 0 \pmod 2 \right\}.$$

These subgroups satisfy the following inclusions: $\Gamma(n) \subset \Gamma_1(n) \subset \Gamma_0(n)$, as well as $\Gamma(2) \subset \Lambda$.

=== Properties of congruence subgroups ===
The congruence subgroups of the modular group and the associated Riemann surfaces are distinguished by some particularly nice geometric and topological properties. Here is a sample:

- There are only finitely many congruence covers of the modular surface that have genus zero;
- (Selberg's 3/16 theorem) If $f$ is a nonconstant eigenfunction of the Laplace-Beltrami operator on a congruence cover of the modular surface with eigenvalue $\lambda$ then $\lambda \geqslant \tfrac{3}{16}$.

There is also a collection of distinguished operators called Hecke operators on smooth functions on congruence covers, which commute with each other and with the Laplace–Beltrami operator and are diagonalisable in each eigenspace of the latter. Their common eigenfunctions are a fundamental example of automorphic forms. Other automorphic forms associated to these congruence subgroups are the holomorphic modular forms, which can be interpreted as cohomology classes on the associated Riemann surfaces via the Eichler-Shimura isomorphism.

=== Normalisers of Hecke congruence subgroups ===
The normalizer $\Gamma_0(p)^+$ of $\Gamma_0(p)$ in $\mathrm{SL}_2(\R)$ has been investigated; one result from the 1970s, due to Jean-Pierre Serre, Andrew Ogg and John G. Thompson is that the corresponding modular curve (the Riemann surface resulting from taking the quotient of the hyperbolic plane by $\Gamma_0(p)^+$) has genus zero (i.e., the modular curve is a Riemann sphere) if and only if $p$ is 2, 3, 5, 7, 11, 13, 17, 19, 23, 29, 31, 41, 47, 59, or 71. When Ogg later heard about the monster group, he noticed that these were precisely the prime factors of the size of $M$, he wrote up a paper offering a bottle of Jack Daniel's whiskey to anyone who could explain this fact – this was a starting point for the theory of monstrous moonshine, which explains deep connections between modular function theory and the monster group.

== In arithmetic groups ==
=== Arithmetic groups ===
The notion of an arithmetic group is a vast generalisation based upon the fundamental example of $\mathrm{SL}_d(\Z)$. In general, to give a definition one needs a semisimple algebraic group $\mathbf G$ defined over $\Q$ and a faithful representation $\rho$, also defined over $\Q$, from $\mathbf G$ into $\mathrm{GL}_d$; then an arithmetic group in $\mathbf G(\Q)$ is any group $\Gamma \subset \mathbf G(\Q)$ that is of finite index in the stabiliser of a finite-index sub-lattice in $\Z^d$.

=== Congruence subgroups ===
Let $\Gamma$ be an arithmetic group: for simplicity it is better to suppose that $\Gamma \subset \mathrm{GL}_n(\Z)$. As in the case of $\mathrm{SL}_2(\Z)$ there are reduction morphisms $\pi_n: \Gamma \to \mathrm{GL}_d(\Z/n\Z)$. We can define a principal congruence subgroup of $\Gamma$ to be the kernel of $\pi_n$ (which may a priori depend on the representation $\rho$), and a congruence subgroup of $\Gamma$ to be any subgroup that contains a principal congruence subgroup (a notion that does not depend on a representation). They are subgroups of finite index that correspond to the subgroups of the finite groups $\pi_n(\Gamma)$, and the level is defined.

=== Examples ===
The principal congruence subgroups of $\mathrm{SL}_d(\Z )$ are the subgroups $\Gamma(n)$ given by:

$$\Gamma(n) = \left\{(a_{ij}) \in \mathrm{SL}_d(\Z ): \forall i \, a_{ii} \equiv 1 \pmod n, \, \forall i \neq j \, a_{ij} \equiv 0 \pmod n \right\}$$

the congruence subgroups then correspond to the subgroups of $\mathrm{SL}_d(\Z/n\Z )$.

Another example of arithmetic group is given by the groups $\mathrm{SL}_2(O)$ where $O$ is the ring of integers in a number field, for example $O = \Z[\sqrt 2]$. Then if $\mathfrak p$ is a prime ideal dividing a rational prime $p$ the subgroups $\Gamma(\mathfrak p)$ that is the kernel of the reduction map mod $\mathfrak p$ is a congruence subgroup since it contains the principal congruence subgroup defined by reduction modulo $p$.

Yet another arithmetic group is the Siegel modular groups $\mathrm{Sp}_{2g}(\Z)$, defined by:

$$\mathrm{Sp}_{2g}(\Z) = \left\{ \gamma \in \mathrm{GL}_{2g}(\Z) : \ \gamma^{\mathrm{T}} \begin{pmatrix} 0 & I_g \\ -I_g & 0 \end{pmatrix} \gamma= \begin{pmatrix} 0 & I_g \\ -I_g & 0 \end{pmatrix} \right\}.$$

Note that if $g = 1$ then $\mathrm{Sp}_2(\Z) = \mathrm{SL}_2(\Z)$. The theta subgroup $\Gamma_{\vartheta}^{(n)}$ of $\mathrm{Sp}_{2g}(\Z)$ is the set of all $\left ( \begin{smallmatrix} A & B \\ C & D \end{smallmatrix}\right ) \in \mathrm{Sp}_{2g}(\Z)$ such that both $AB^\top$ and $CD^\top$ have even diagonal entries.

=== Property (τ) ===
The family of congruence subgroups in a given arithmetic group $\Gamma$ always has property (τ) of Lubotzky–Zimmer. This can be taken to mean that the Cheeger constant of the family of their Schreier coset graphs (with respect to a fixed generating set for $\Gamma$) is uniformly bounded away from zero, in other words they are a family of expander graphs. There is also a representation-theoretical interpretation: if $\Gamma$ is a lattice in a Lie group $G$ then property (τ) is equivalent to the non-trivial unitary representations of $G$ occurring in the spaces $L^2(G/\Gamma)$ being bounded away from the trivial representation (in the Fell topology on the unitary dual of $G$). Property (τ) is a weakening of Kazhdan's property (T) which implies that the family of all finite-index subgroups has property (τ).

=== In S-arithmetic groups ===
If $\mathbf G$ is a $\Q$-group and $S = \{p_1,\ldots, p_r\}$ is a finite set of primes, an $S$-arithmetic subgroup of $\mathbf G(\Q )$ is defined as an arithmetic subgroup but using $\Z[1/p_1,\ldots, 1/p_r])$ instead of $\Z$. The fundamental example is $\operatorname{SL}_d(\Z [1/p_1,\ldots, 1/p_r])$.

Let $\Gamma_S$ be an $S$-arithmetic group in an algebraic group $\mathbf G \subset \operatorname{GL}_d$. If $n$ is an integer not divisible by any prime in $S$, then all primes $p_i$ are invertible modulo $n$ and it follows that there is a morphism $\pi_n: \Gamma_S \to \mathrm{GL}_d(\Z/n\Z)$. Thus it is possible to define congruence subgroups in $\Gamma_S$, whose level is always coprime to all primes in $S$.

== The congruence subgroup problem ==
=== Finite-index subgroups in SL_{2}(Z) ===
Congruence subgroups in $\Gamma = \mathrm{SL}_2(\Z)$ are finite-index subgroups: it is natural to ask whether they account for all finite-index subgroups in $\Gamma$. The answer is a resounding "no". This fact was already known to Felix Klein and there are many ways to exhibit many non-congruence finite-index subgroups. For example:

1. The simple group in the composition series of a quotient $\Gamma / \Gamma'$, where $\Gamma'$ is a normal congruence subgroup, must be a simple group of Lie type (or cyclic), in fact one of the groups $\mathrm{SL}_2(\mathbb F_p)$ for a prime $p$. But for every $m$ there are finite-index subgroups $\Gamma' \subset \Gamma$ such that $\Gamma / \Gamma'$ is isomorphic to the alternating group $A_m$ (for example $\Gamma(2)$ surjects on any group with two generators, in particular on all alternating groups, and the kernels of these morphisms give an example). These groups thus must be non-congruence.
2. There is a surjection $\Gamma(2) \to \Z$; for $m$ large enough the kernel of $\Gamma(2) \to \Z \to \Z/m\Z$ must be non-congruence (one way to see this is that the Cheeger constant of the Schreier graph goes to 0; there is also a simple algebraic proof in the spirit of the previous item).
3. The number $c_N$ of congruence subgroups in $\Gamma$ of index $N$ satisfies $\log c_N = O \left( (\log N)^2 / \log \log N \right)$. On the other hand, the number $a_N$ of finite index subgroups of index $N$ in $\Gamma$ satisfies $N \log N = O(\log a_N)$, so most subgroups of finite index must be non-congruence.

=== Congruence kernel ===
One can ask the same question for any arithmetic group as for the modular group:

Naïve congruence subgroup problem: Given an arithmetic group, are all of its finite-index subgroups congruence subgroups?

This problem can have a positive solution: its origin is in the work of Hyman Bass, Jean-Pierre Serre and John Milnor, and Jens Mennicke who proved that, in contrast to the case of $\mathrm{SL}_2(\Z)$, when $n \geqslant 3$ all finite-index subgroups in $\mathrm{SL}_n(\Z)$ are congruence subgroups. The solution by Bass–Milnor–Serre involved an aspect of algebraic number theory linked to K-theory. On the other hand, the work of Serre on $\mathrm{SL}_2$ over number fields shows that in some cases the answer to the naïve question is "no" while a slight relaxation of the problem has a positive answer.

This new problem is better stated in terms of certain compact topological groups associated to an arithmetic group $\Gamma$. There is a topology on $\Gamma$ for which a base of neighbourhoods of the trivial subgroup is the set of subgroups of finite index (the profinite topology); and there is another topology defined in the same way using only congruence subgroups. The profinite topology gives rise to a completion $\widehat \Gamma$ of $\Gamma$, while the "congruence" topology gives rise to another completion $\overline \Gamma$. Both are profinite groups and there is a natural surjective morphism $\widehat \Gamma \to \overline \Gamma$ (intuitively, there are fewer conditions for a Cauchy sequence to comply with in the congruence topology than in the profinite topology). The congruence kernel $C(\Gamma)$ is the kernel of this morphism, and the congruence subgroup problem stated above amounts to whether $C(\Gamma)$ is trivial. The weakening of the conclusion then leads to the following problem.

Congruence subgroup problem: Is the congruence kernel $C(\Gamma)$ finite?

When the problem has a positive solution one says that $\Gamma$ has the congruence subgroup property. A conjecture generally attributed to Serre states that an irreducible arithmetic lattice in a semisimple Lie group $G$ has the congruence subgroup property if and only if the real rank of $G$ is at least 2; for example, lattices in $\mathrm{SL}_3(\R)$ should always have the property.

=== Negative solutions ===
Serre's conjecture states that a lattice in a Lie group of rank one should not have the congruence subgroup property. There are three families of such groups: the orthogonal groups $\mathrm{SO}(d, 1), d \geqslant 2$, the unitary groups $\mathrm{SU}(d, 1), d \geqslant 2$ and the groups $\mathrm{Sp}(d,1), d \geqslant 2$ (the isometry groups of a sesquilinear form over the Hamilton quaternions), plus the exceptional group $F_4^{-20}$ (see List of simple Lie groups). The current status of the congruence subgroup problem is as follows:

- It is known to have a negative solution (confirming the conjecture) for all groups $\mathrm{SO}(d,1)$ with $d \neq 7$. The proof uses the same argument as 2. in the case of $\mathrm{SL}_2(\Z)$: in the general case it is much harder to construct a surjection to $\Z$, the proof is not at all uniform for all cases and fails for some lattices in dimension 7 due to the phenomenon of triality. In dimensions 2 and 3 and for some lattices in higher dimensions argument 1 and 3 also apply.
- It is known for many lattices in $\mathrm{SU}(d,1)$, but not all (again using a generalisation of argument 2).
- It is completely open in all remaining cases.

=== Positive solutions ===
In many situations where the congruence subgroup problem is expected to have a positive solution it has been proven that this is indeed the case. Here is a list of algebraic groups such that the congruence subgroup property is known to hold for the associated arithmetic lattices, in case the rank of the associated Lie group (or more generally the sum of the rank of the real and $p$-adic factors in the case of $S$-arithmetic groups) is at least 2:

- Any non-anisotropic group (this includes the cases dealt with by Bass–Milnor–Serre, as well as $\mathrm{SO}(p,q)$ is $\min(p, q) > 1$, and many others);
- Any group of type not $A_n$ (for example all anisotropic forms of symplectic or orthogonal groups of real rank $\geqslant 2$);
- Unitary groups of hermitian forms.

The cases of inner and outer forms of type $A_n$ are still open. The algebraic groups in the case of inner forms of type $A_n$ are those associated to the unit groups in central simple division algebras; for example the congruence subgroup property is not known for lattices in $\mathrm{SL}_3(\R)$ or $\mathrm{SL}_2(\R) \times \mathrm{SL}_2(\R)$ with compact quotient.

== Congruence groups and adèle groups ==
The ring of adeles $\mathbb A$ is the restricted product of all completions of $\Q$, i.e.

$$\mathbb A = \R \times \prod_p' \Q _p$$

where the product is over the set $\mathcal P$ of all primes, $\Q _p$ is the field of p-adic numbers and an element $(x, (x_p)_{p \in \mathcal P})$ belongs to the restricted product if and only if for almost all primes $p$, $x_p$ belongs to the subring $\mathbb Z_p$ of p-adic integers.

Given any algebraic group $\mathbf G$ over $\Q$ the adelic algebraic group $\mathbf G(\mathbb A)$ is well-defined. It can be endowed with a canonical topology, which in the case where $\mathbf G$ is a linear algebraic group is the topology as a subset of $\mathbb A^m$. The finite adèles $\mathbb A_f$ are the restricted product of all non-archimedean completions (all p-adic fields).

If $\Gamma \subset \mathbf G(\Q )$ is an arithmetic group then its congruence subgroups are characterised by the following property: $H \subset \Gamma$ is a congruence subgroup if and only if its closure $\overline H \subset \mathbf G(\mathbb A_f)$ is a compact-open subgroup (compactness is automatic) and $H = \Gamma \cap \overline H$. In general the group $\Gamma \cap \overline H$ is equal to the congruence closure of $H$ in $\Gamma$, and the congruence topology on $\Gamma$ is the induced topology as a subgroup of $\mathbf G(\mathbb A_f)$, in particular the congruence completion $\overline \Gamma$ is its closure in that group. These remarks are also valid for $S$-arithmetic subgroups, replacing the ring of finite adèles with the restricted product over all primes not in $S$.

More generally one can define what it means for a subgroup $\Gamma \subset \mathbf G(\Q)$ to be a congruence subgroup without explicit reference to a fixed arithmetic subgroup, by asking that it be equal to its congruence closure $\overline \Gamma \cap \mathbf G(\Q)$. Thus it becomes possible to study all congruence subgroups at once by looking at the discrete subgroup $\mathbf G(\Q) \subset \mathbf G(\mathbb A)$. This is especially convenient in the theory of automorphic forms: for example all modern treatments of the Arthur–Selberg trace formula are done in this adélic setting.
