= Complex multiplication =

Theory of a class of elliptic curves

In mathematics, complex multiplication (CM) is the theory of elliptic curves E that have an endomorphism ring larger than the integers. Put another way, it contains the theory of elliptic functions with extra symmetries, such as are visible when the period lattice is the Gaussian integer lattice or Eisenstein integer lattice.

It has an aspect belonging to the theory of special functions, because such elliptic functions, or abelian functions of several complex variables, are then 'very special' functions satisfying extra identities and taking explicitly calculable special values at particular points. It has also turned out to be a central theme in algebraic number theory, allowing some features of the theory of cyclotomic fields to be carried over to wider areas of application. David Hilbert is said to have remarked that the theory of complex multiplication of elliptic curves was not only the most beautiful part of mathematics but of all science.

There is also the higher-dimensional complex multiplication theory of abelian varieties A having enough endomorphisms in a certain precise sense, roughly that the action on the tangent space at the identity element of A is a direct sum of one-dimensional modules.

== Example of the imaginary quadratic field extension ==
An elliptic curve over the complex numbers is obtained as a quotient of the complex plane by a lattice Λ, here spanned by two fundamental periods ω_{1} and ω_{2}. The four-torsion is also shown, corresponding to the lattice 1/4 Λ containing Λ. The example of an elliptic curve corresponding to the Gaussian integers occurs when ω_{2} = i ω_{1}.

Consider an imaginary quadratic field $K = \Q\left(\sqrt{-d}\right) , \, d \in \Z, d > 0$. An elliptic function $f$ is said to have complex multiplication if there is an algebraic relation between $f(z)$ and $f(\lambda z)$ for all $\lambda$ in $K$.

Conversely, Kronecker conjectured – in what became known as the Kronecker Jugendtraum – that every abelian extension of $K$ could be obtained by the (roots of the) equation of a suitable elliptic curve with complex multiplication. To this day this remains one of the few cases of Hilbert's twelfth problem which has actually been solved.

An example of an elliptic curve with complex multiplication is

$$\mathbb{C}/ (\theta \mathbb{Z}[i])$$

where Z[i] is the Gaussian integer ring, and θ is any non-zero complex number. Any such complex torus has the Gaussian integers as endomorphism ring. It is known that the corresponding curves can all be written as

$$Y^2 = 4X^3 - aX$$

for some $a \in \mathbb{C}$, which demonstrably has two conjugate order-4 automorphisms sending

$$Y \to \pm iY,\quad X \to -X$$

in line with the action of i on the Weierstrass elliptic functions.

More generally, consider the lattice Λ, an additive group in the complex plane, generated by $\omega_1,\omega_2$. Then we define the Weierstrass function of the variable $z$ in $\mathbb{C}$ as follows:

$$\wp(z;\Lambda) = \wp(z;\omega_1,\omega_2) = \frac{1}{z^2} + \sum_{(m,n)\ne (0,0)} \left\{\frac{1}{(z+m\omega_1+n\omega_2)^2} - \frac{1}{\left(m\omega_1+n\omega_2\right)^2}\right\},$$

and

$$g_2 = 60\sum_{(m,n) \neq (0,0)} (m\omega_1+n\omega_2)^{-4}$$
$$g_3 =140\sum_{(m,n) \neq (0,0)} (m\omega_1+n\omega_2)^{-6}.$$

Let $\wp'$ be the derivative of $\wp$. Then we obtain an isomorphism of complex Lie groups:

$$w\mapsto(\wp(w):\wp'(w):1) \in \mathbb{P}^2(\mathbb{C})$$

from the complex torus group $\mathbb{C}/\Lambda$ to the projective elliptic curve defined in homogeneous coordinates by

$$E = \left\{ (x:y:z) \in \mathbb{C}^3 \mid y^2z = 4x^3 - g_2xz^2 - g_3 z^3 \right\}$$

and where the point at infinity, the zero element of the group law of the elliptic curve, is by convention taken to be $(0:1:0)$. If the lattice defining the elliptic curve is actually preserved under multiplication by (possibly a proper subring of) the ring of integers $\mathfrak{o}_K$ of $K$, then the ring of analytic automorphisms of $E = \mathbb{C}/\Lambda$ turns out to be isomorphic to this (sub)ring.

If we rewrite $\tau = \omega_1/\omega_2$ where $\operatorname{Im}\tau > 0$ and $\Delta(\Lambda) = g_2(\Lambda)^3 - 27g_3(\Lambda)^2$, then

$$j(\tau)=j(E)=j(\Lambda)=2^63^3g_2(\Lambda)^3/\Delta(\Lambda)\ .$$

This means that the j-invariant of $E$ is an algebraic number – lying in $K$ – if $E$ has complex multiplication.

== Abstract theory of endomorphisms ==
The ring of endomorphisms of an elliptic curve can be of one of three forms: the integers Z; an order in an imaginary quadratic number field; or an order in a definite quaternion algebra over Q.

When the field of definition is a finite field, there are always non-trivial endomorphisms of an elliptic curve, coming from the Frobenius map, so every such curve has complex multiplication (and the terminology is not often applied). But when the base field is a number field, complex multiplication is the exception. It is known that, in a general sense, the case of complex multiplication is the hardest to resolve for the Hodge conjecture.

== Kronecker and abelian extensions ==
Kronecker first postulated that the values of elliptic functions at torsion points should be enough to generate all abelian extensions for imaginary quadratic fields, an idea that went back to Eisenstein in some cases, and even to Gauss. This became known as the Kronecker Jugendtraum; and was certainly what had prompted Hilbert's remark above, since it makes explicit class field theory in the way the roots of unity do for abelian extensions of the rational number field, via Shimura's reciprocity law.

Indeed, let K be an imaginary quadratic field with class field H. Let E be an elliptic curve with complex multiplication by the integers of K, defined over H. Then the maximal abelian extension of K is generated by the x-coordinates of the points of finite order on some Weierstrass model for E over H.

Many generalisations have been sought of Kronecker's ideas; they do however lie somewhat obliquely to the main thrust of the Langlands philosophy, and there is no definitive statement currently known.

== Sample consequence ==
It is no accident that Ramanujan's constant, the transcendental number

$$e^{\pi \sqrt{163}} = 262537412640768743.99999999999925007\dots\,$$

or equivalently,

$$e^{\pi \sqrt{163}} = 640320^3+743.99999999999925007\dots\,$$

is an almost integer, in that it is very close to an integer. This remarkable fact is explained by the theory of complex multiplication, together with some knowledge of modular forms, and the fact that

$$\mathbf{Z}\left[ \frac{1+\sqrt{-163}}{2}\right]$$

is a unique factorization domain.

Here $(1+\sqrt{-163})/2$ satisfies α^{2} = α − 41. In general, S[α] denotes the set of all polynomial expressions in α with coefficients in S, which is the smallest ring containing α and S. Because α satisfies this quadratic equation, the required polynomials can be limited to degree one.

Alternatively,

$$e^{\pi \sqrt{163}} = 12^3(231^2-1)^3+743.99999999999925007\dots\,$$

an internal structure due to certain Eisenstein series, and with similar simple expressions for the other Heegner numbers.

== Singular moduli ==
The points of the upper half-plane τ which correspond to the period ratios of elliptic curves over the complex numbers with complex multiplication are precisely the imaginary quadratic numbers. The corresponding modular invariants j(τ) are the singular moduli, coming from an older terminology in which "singular" referred to the property of having non-trivial endomorphisms rather than referring to a singular curve.

The modular function j(τ) is algebraic on imaginary quadratic numbers τ: these are the only algebraic numbers in the upper half-plane for which j is algebraic.

If Λ is a lattice with period ratio τ then we write j(Λ) for j(τ). If further Λ is an ideal a in the ring of integers O_{K} of a quadratic imaginary field K then we write j(a) for the corresponding singular modulus. The values j(a) are then real algebraic integers, and generate the Hilbert class field H of K: the field extension degree [H:K] = h is the class number of K and the H/K is a Galois extension with Galois group isomorphic to the ideal class group of K. The class group acts on the values j(a) by [b] : j(a) → j(ab).

In particular, if K has class number one, then j(a) = j(O) is a rational integer: for example, j(Z[i]) = j(i) = 1728.

== See also ==
- Algebraic Hecke character
- Heegner point
- Hilbert's twelfth problem
- Lubin–Tate formal group, local fields
- Drinfeld shtuka, global function field case
- Wiles's proof of Fermat's Last Theorem
