= Atkin–Lehner theory =

Part of the theory of modular forms

In mathematics, Atkin–Lehner theory is part of the theory of modular forms describing when they arise at a given integer level N in such a way that the theory of Hecke operators can be extended to higher levels.

Atkin–Lehner theory is based on the concept of a newform, which is a cusp form 'new' at a given level N, where the levels are the nested congruence subgroups:

$$\Gamma_0(N) = \left\{ \begin{pmatrix} a & b \\ c & d \end{pmatrix} \in \text{SL}(2, \mathbf{Z}): c \equiv 0 \pmod{N} \right\}$$

of the modular group, with N ordered by divisibility. That is, if M divides N, Γ_{0}(N) is a subgroup of Γ_{0}(M). The oldforms for Γ_{0}(N) are those modular forms f(τ) of level N of the form g(d τ) for modular forms g of level M with M a proper divisor of N, where d divides N/M. The newforms are defined as a vector subspace of the modular forms of level N, complementary to the space spanned by the oldforms, i.e. the orthogonal space with respect to the Petersson inner product.

The Hecke operators, which act on the space of all cusp forms, preserve the subspace of newforms and are self-adjoint and commuting operators (with respect to the Petersson inner product) when restricted to this subspace. Therefore, the algebra of operators on newforms they generate is a finite-dimensional C*-algebra that is commutative; and by the spectral theory of such operators, there exists a basis for the space of newforms consisting of eigenforms for the full Hecke algebra.

== Atkin–Lehner involutions ==
Consider a Hall divisor e of N, which means that not only does e divide N, but also e and N/e are relatively prime (often denoted e||N). If N has s distinct prime divisors, there are 2^{s} Hall divisors of N; for example, if N = 360 = 2^{3}⋅3^{2}⋅5^{1}, the 8 Hall divisors of N are 1, 2^{3}, 3^{2}, 5^{1}, 2^{3}⋅3^{2}, 2^{3}⋅5^{1}, 3^{2}⋅5^{1}, and 2^{3}⋅3^{2}⋅5^{1}.

For each Hall divisor e of N, choose an integral matrix W_{e} of the form

$$W_e = \begin{pmatrix}ae & b \\ cN & de \end{pmatrix}$$

with det W_{e} = e. These matrices have the following properties:

- The elements W_{e} normalize Γ_{0}(N): that is, if A is in Γ_{0}(N), then W_{e}AW^{−1}_{e} is in Γ_{0}(N).
- The matrix W^{2}_{e}, which has determinant e^{2}, can be written as eA where A is in Γ_{0}(N). We will be interested in operators on cusp forms coming from the action of W_{e} on Γ_{0}(N) by conjugation, under which both the scalar e and the matrix A act trivially. Therefore, the equality W^{2}_{e} = eA implies that the action of W_{e} squares to the identity; for this reason, the resulting operator is called an Atkin–Lehner involution.
- If e and f are both Hall divisors of N, then W_{e} and W_{f} commute modulo Γ_{0}(N). Moreover, if we define g to be the Hall divisor g = ef/(e,f)^{2}, their product is equal to W_{g} modulo Γ_{0}(N).
- If we had chosen a different matrix W ′_{e} instead of W_{e}, it turns out that W_{e} ≡ W ′_{e} modulo Γ_{0}(N), so W_{e} and W ′_{e} would determine the same Atkin–Lehner involution.

We can summarize these properties as follows. Consider the subgroup of GL(2,Q) generated by Γ_{0}(N) together with the matrices W_{e}; let Γ_{0}(N)^{+} denote its quotient by positive scalar matrices. Then Γ_{0}(N) is a normal subgroup of Γ_{0}(N)^{+} of index 2^{s} (where s is the number of distinct prime factors of N); the quotient group is isomorphic to (Z/2Z)^{s} and acts on the cusp forms via the Atkin–Lehner involutions.
