= Field of definition =

In mathematics, the field of definition of an algebraic variety V is essentially the smallest field to which the coefficients of the polynomials defining V can belong. Given polynomials, with coefficients in a field K, it may not be obvious whether there is a smaller field k, and other polynomials defined over k, which still define V.

The issue of field of definition is of concern in diophantine geometry.

== Notation ==
Throughout this article, k denotes a field. The algebraic closure of a field is denoted by adding a superscript of "alg", e.g. the algebraic closure of k is k^{alg}. The symbols Q, R, C, and F_{p} represent, respectively, the field of rational numbers, the field of real numbers, the field of complex numbers, and the finite field containing p elements. Affine n-space over a field F is denoted by A^{n}(F).

== Definitions for affine and projective varieties ==
Results and definitions stated below, for affine varieties, can be translated to projective varieties, by replacing A^{n}(k^{alg}) with projective space of dimension n − 1 over k^{alg}, and by requiring all polynomials to be homogeneous.

A k-algebraic set is the zero-locus in A^{n}(k^{alg}) of a subset of the polynomial ring k[x_{1}, ..., x_{n}]. A k-variety is a k-algebraic set that is irreducible, i.e. is not the union of two strictly smaller k-algebraic sets. A k-morphism is a regular function between k-algebraic sets whose defining polynomials' coefficients belong to k.

One reason for considering the zero-locus in A^{n}(k^{alg}) and not A^{n}(k) is that, for two distinct k-algebraic sets X_{1} and X_{2}, the intersections X_{1} ∩ A^{n}(k) and X_{2} ∩ A^{n}(k) can be identical; in fact, the zero-locus in A^{n}(k) of any subset of k[x_{1}, ..., x_{n}] is the zero-locus of a single element of k[x_{1}, ..., x_{n}] if k is not algebraically closed.

A k-variety is called a variety if it is absolutely irreducible, i.e. is not the union of two strictly smaller k^{alg}-algebraic sets. A variety V is defined over k if every polynomial in k^{alg}[x_{1}, ..., x_{n}] that vanishes on V is the linear combination (over k^{alg}) of polynomials in k[x_{1}, ..., x_{n}] that vanish on V. A k-algebraic set is also an L-algebraic set for infinitely many subfields L of k^{alg}. A field of definition of a variety V is a subfield L of k^{alg} such that V is an L-variety defined over L.

Equivalently, a k-variety V is a variety defined over k if and only if the function field k(V) of V is a regular extension of k, in the sense of Weil. That means every subset of k(V) that is linearly independent over k is also linearly independent over k^{alg}. In other words those extensions of k are linearly disjoint.

André Weil proved that the intersection of all fields of definition of a variety V is itself a field of definition. This justifies saying that any variety possesses a unique, minimal field of definition. However, this does not apply to abstract varieties, and in fact, counterexamples exist.

== Examples ==
1. The zero-locus of x_{1}^{2}+ x_{2}^{2} is both a Q-variety and a Q^{alg}-algebraic set but neither a variety nor a Q^{alg}-variety, since it is the union of the Q^{alg}-varieties defined by the polynomials x_{1} + ix_{2} and x_{1} − ix_{2}.
2. With F_{p}(t) a transcendental extension of F_{p}, the polynomial x_{1}^{p} − t equals (x_{1} − t^{1/p}) ^{p} in the polynomial ring (F_{p}(t))^{alg}[x_{1}]. The F_{p}(t)-algebraic set V defined by x_{1}^{p} − t is a variety; it is absolutely irreducible because it consists of a single point. But V is not defined over F_{p}(t), since V is also the zero-locus of x_{1} − t^{1/p}.
3. The complex projective line is a projective R-variety. (In fact, it is a variety with Q as its minimal field of definition.) Viewing the real projective line as being the equator on the Riemann sphere, the coordinate-wise action of complex conjugation on the complex projective line swaps points with the same longitude but opposite latitudes.
4. The projective R-variety W defined by the homogeneous polynomial x_{1}^{2} + x_{2}^{2} + x_{3}^{2} is also a variety with minimal field of definition Q. The following map defines a C-isomorphism from the complex projective line to W: (a,b) → (2ab, a^{2}−b^{2}, −i(a^{2}+b^{2})). Identifying W with the Riemann sphere using this map, the coordinate-wise action of complex conjugation on W interchanges opposite points of the sphere. The complex projective line cannot be R-isomorphic to W because the former has real points, points fixed by complex conjugation, while the latter does not.

== Scheme-theoretic definitions ==
One advantage of defining varieties over arbitrary fields through the theory of schemes is that such definitions are intrinsic and free of embeddings into ambient affine n-space.

A k-algebraic set is a separated and reduced scheme of finite type over Spec(k). A k-variety is an irreducible k-algebraic set. A k-morphism is a morphism between k-algebraic sets regarded as schemes over Spec(k).

To every algebraic extension L of k, the L-algebraic set associated to a given k-algebraic set V is the fiber product of schemes V ×_{Spec(k)} Spec(L). A k-variety is absolutely irreducible if the associated k^{alg}-algebraic set is an irreducible scheme; in this case, the k-variety is called a variety. An absolutely irreducible k-variety is defined over k if the associated k^{alg}-algebraic set is a reduced scheme. A field of definition of a variety V is a subfield L of k^{alg} such that there exists a k∩L-variety W such that W ×_{Spec(k∩L)} Spec(k) is isomorphic to V and the final object in the category of reduced schemes over W ×_{Spec(k∩L)} Spec(L) is an L-variety defined over L.

Analogously to the definitions for affine and projective varieties, a k-variety is a variety defined over k if the stalk of the structure sheaf at the generic point is a regular extension of k; furthermore, every variety has a minimal field of definition.

One disadvantage of the scheme-theoretic definition is that a scheme over k cannot have an L-valued point if L is not an extension of k. For example, the rational point (1,1,1) is a solution to the equation x_{1} + ix_{2} - (1+i)x_{3} but the corresponding Q[i]-variety V has no Spec(Q)-valued point. The two definitions of field of definition are also discrepant, e.g. the (scheme-theoretic) minimal field of definition of V is Q, while in the first definition it would have been Q[i]. The reason for this discrepancy is that the scheme-theoretic definitions only keep track of the polynomial set up to change of basis. In this example, one way to avoid these problems is to use the Q-variety Spec(Q[x_{1},x_{2},x_{3}]/(x_{1}^{2}+ x_{2}^{2}+ 2x_{3}^{2}- 2x_{1}x_{3} - 2x_{2}x_{3})), whose associated Q[i]-algebraic set is the union of the Q[i]-variety Spec(Q[i][x_{1},x_{2},x_{3}]/(x_{1} + ix_{2} - (1+i)x_{3})) and its complex conjugate.

== Action of the absolute Galois group ==
The absolute Galois group Gal(k^{alg}/k) of k naturally acts on the zero-locus in A^{n}(k^{alg}) of a subset of the polynomial ring k[x_{1}, ..., x_{n}]. In general, if V is a scheme over k (e.g. a k-algebraic set), Gal(k^{alg}/k) naturally acts on V ×_{Spec(k)} Spec(k^{alg}) via its action on Spec(k^{alg}).

When V is a variety defined over a perfect field k, the scheme V can be recovered from the scheme V ×_{Spec(k)} Spec(k^{alg}) together with the action of Gal(k^{alg}/k) on the latter scheme: the sections of the structure sheaf of V on an open subset U are exactly the sections of the structure sheaf of V ×_{Spec(k)} Spec(k^{alg}) on U ×_{Spec(k)} Spec(k^{alg}) whose residues are constant on each Gal(k^{alg}/k)-orbit in U ×_{Spec(k)} Spec(k^{alg}). In the affine case, this means the action of the absolute Galois group on the zero-locus is sufficient to recover the subset of k[x_{1}, ..., x_{n}] consisting of vanishing polynomials.

In general, this information is not sufficient to recover V. In the example of the zero-locus of x_{1}^{p} − t in (F_{p}(t))^{alg}, the variety consists of a single point and so the action of the absolute Galois group cannot distinguish whether the ideal of vanishing polynomials was generated by x_{1} − t^{1/p}, by x_{1}^{p} − t, or, indeed, by x_{1} − t^{1/p} raised to some other power of p.

For any subfield L of k^{alg} and any L-variety V, an automorphism σ of k^{alg} will map V isomorphically onto a σ(L)-variety.
