= Supersingular variety =

Mathematical concept

In mathematics, a supersingular variety is (usually) a smooth projective variety in nonzero characteristic such that for all n the slopes of the Newton polygon of the nth crystalline cohomology are all n/2. For special classes of varieties such as elliptic curves, it is common to use various ad hoc definitions of "supersingular", which are (usually) equivalent to the one given above. At the opposite extreme, a variety is called ordinary if its Newton polygon coincides with its Hodge polygon. Despite the terminology, "supersingular" and "singular" do not indicate that the variety has singularities.

== History ==
The term "singular elliptic curve" (or "singular j-invariant") was originally used to refer to complex elliptic curves whose ring of endomorphisms has rank 2, the maximum possible over the complex numbers. In the 1930s, Helmut Hasse discovered that elliptic curves over finite fields can have even larger endomorphism rings of rank 4, and these were termed "supersingular elliptic curves".

As the theory of crystalline cohomology was developed by Alexander Grothendieck and Pierre Berthelot in the 1960s and 1970s, it became possible to characterize the supersingularity of an elliptic curve in terms of the slopes of the Newton polygon of its first crystalline cohomology group. This cohomological perspective led to the generalization of the concept to other classes of varieties: a variety is supersingular when its Newton polygon has all slopes concentrated at the middle value. The notion was extended to abelian varieties, K3 surfaces, and Enriques surfaces.

== Formal definition ==
Let X be a smooth projective variety over a perfect field k of characteristic p > 0, and let W(k) denote the ring of Witt vectors of k. The crystalline cohomology groups H^{n}_{cris}(X/W(k)) are finitely generated modules over W(k), equipped with a Frobenius-linear endomorphism. The Newton polygon of H^{n}_{cris}(X/W(k)) encodes the p-adic valuations of the eigenvalues of Frobenius acting on the associated F-isocrystal.

The variety X is supersingular if, for every non-negative integer n, all slopes of the Newton polygon of H^{n}_{cris}(X/W(k)) are equal to n/2. For a variety over a finite field F_{q}, this is equivalent to the condition that all eigenvalues of Frobenius on the l-adic cohomology H^{n}(X, Q_{l}) are q^{n/2} times roots of unity.

A fundamental result of Barry Mazur and Nicholas Katz establishes that the Newton polygon always lies on or above the Hodge polygon; a supersingular variety represents the case where the Newton polygon lies as high as possible.

== Classes of supersingular varieties ==
=== Elliptic curves ===
An elliptic curve E over a field of characteristic p > 0 is supersingular if and only if its endomorphism ring is an order in a quaternion algebra, giving it rank 4 rather than the rank 2 typical of ordinary elliptic curves. In terms of crystalline cohomology, E is supersingular if and only if the Newton polygon of H^{1}_{cris}(E/W(k)) has a single slope of 1/2, rather than slopes 0 and 1 as in the ordinary case.

For each prime p, there are only finitely many j-invariants corresponding to supersingular elliptic curves over the algebraic closure of F_{p}, and all such j-invariants lie in F_{p^{2}}. The first example of a supersingular elliptic curve was observed by John Tate over fields of characteristic 3, using the Fermat quartic.

=== Abelian varieties ===
A supersingular abelian variety of dimension g over a field of characteristic p > 0 can be defined either as an abelian variety that is isogenous to a product of supersingular elliptic curves, or as one whose endomorphism algebra has dimension (2g)^{2} over Q. The Newton polygon of a supersingular abelian variety of dimension g has all slopes equal to 1/2. Because the cohomology ring of an abelian variety is the exterior algebra of its first cohomology group, supersingularity of an abelian variety is determined entirely by H^{1}.

=== K3 surfaces ===
For K3 surfaces in characteristic p > 0, two related notions of supersingularity have been studied. A K3 surface is Artin supersingular if the slopes of Frobenius on H^{2}_{cris} are all equal to 1, or equivalently if its formal Brauer group has infinite height. A K3 surface is Shioda supersingular if the rank of its Néron–Severi group equals its second Betti number, which is 22 for all K3 surfaces.

Michael Artin conjectured that the two notions coincide: that a K3 surface with formal Brauer group of infinite height must have Picard number 22. The Tate conjecture for K3 surfaces of finite height was proved by Niels Nygaard and Arthur Ogus, and Artin's conjecture was established in characteristic p ≥ 3 through work of Maulik, Charles, and Madapusi Pera, which together also completed the proof of the Tate conjecture for K3 surfaces in those characteristics.

K3 surfaces with Picard number 22 exist only in positive characteristic; Hodge theory implies that the Picard number of a K3 surface over the complex numbers is at most 20. The first example was given by Tate, who observed that the Fermat quartic surface has Picard number 22 over algebraically closed fields of characteristic p ≡ 3 (mod 4).

=== Enriques surfaces ===
In characteristic other than 2, Enriques surfaces are quotients of K3 surfaces by a free involution and do not exhibit supersingular behavior. In characteristic 2, Enrico Bombieri and David Mumford showed that Enriques surfaces fall into three classes — classical, singular, and supersingular — distinguished by the structure of their Picard scheme. A supersingular Enriques surface in characteristic 2 has H^{1}(O_{X}) of dimension 1 with trivial Frobenius action, trivial canonical bundle, and its Picard scheme Pic^{τ} is isomorphic to the group scheme α_{2}. Its canonical double cover is a purely inseparable α_{2}-cover of a surface with trivial dualizing sheaf.

== Shioda and Artin supersingularity for surfaces ==
For algebraic surfaces more generally, the notions introduced for K3 surfaces can be formulated as follows:

- A surface is Shioda supersingular if the rank of its Néron–Severi group equals its second Betti number.
- A surface is Artin supersingular if its formal Brauer group has infinite height.

The Tate conjecture implies that for surfaces over algebraically closed fields, Artin supersingularity implies Shioda supersingularity. The converse — whether Shioda supersingularity implies Artin supersingularity — is not known in full generality.

== See also ==
- Crystalline cohomology
- F-crystal
- Newton polygon
- Formal group
