= Steven Sperber =

American mathematician (born 1945)

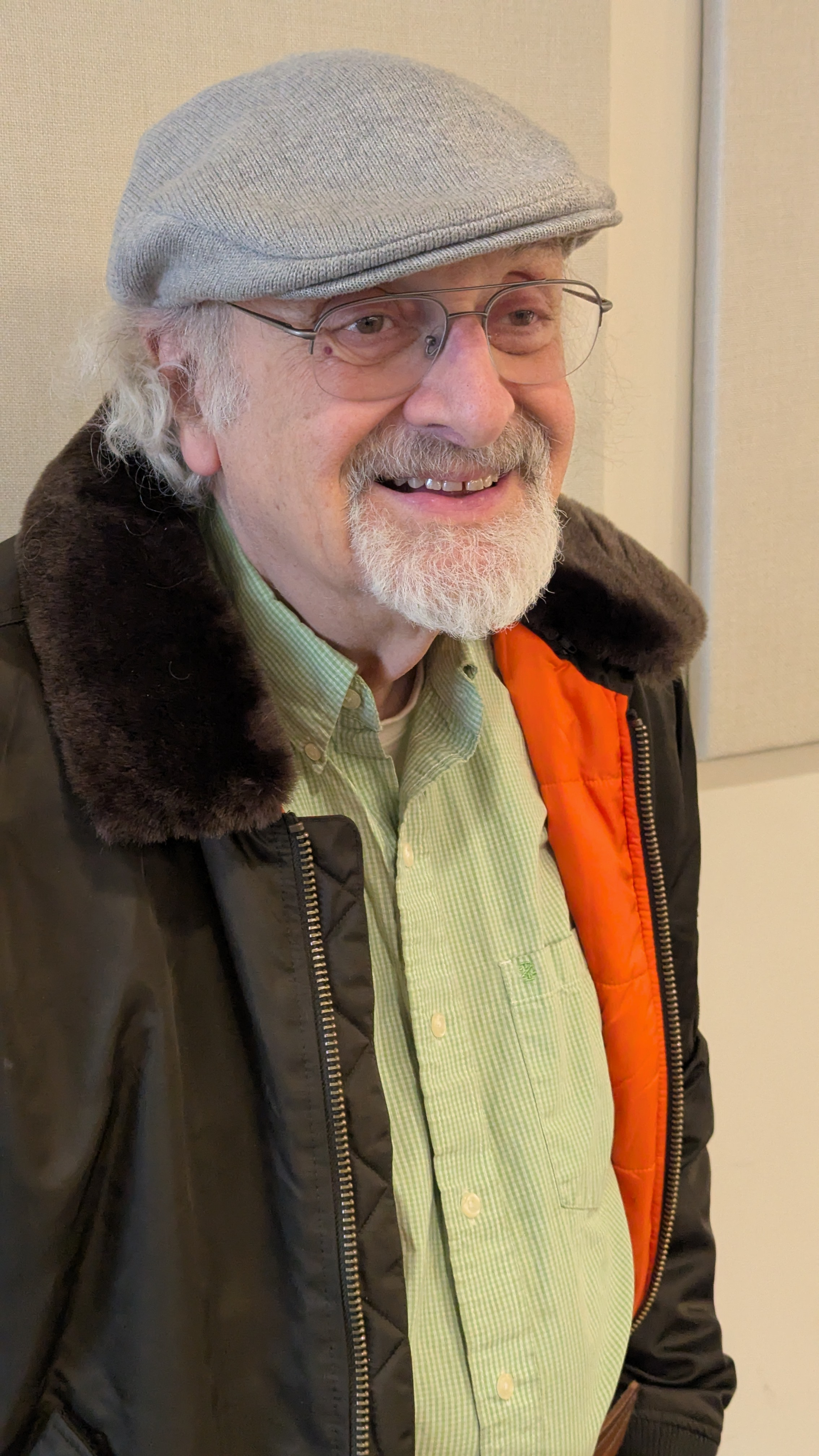
- Born: May 25, 1945 (age 81); Brooklyn, New York
- Occupations: Mathematician, academic, and author

Academic background
- Education: Ph.D.
- Alma mater: University of Pennsylvania
- Doctoral advisor: Bernard Dwork

Academic work
- Institutions: University of Minnesota

Steven Sperber is an American mathematician, academic, and author. He is a professor at the University of Minnesota.

Sperber's research has focused on arithmetic algebraic geometry, p-adic differential equations, and their applications in advanced number theory and mathematical structures. His scholarly contributions include publications in Annals of Mathematics, Inventiones Mathematicae, and Compositio Mathematica, alongside the authorship of p-Adic Methods in Number Theory and Algebraic Geometry.

== Education ==
Sperber attended S.J. Tilden High School in Brooklyn and enrolled at Brooklyn College in 1962. He began his graduate studies at Harvard in 1966, then transferred to the University of Pennsylvania in 1967, where he worked with Stephen Shatz. Later, he earned his Ph.D. in 1975 from the University of Pennsylvania, with Bernard Dwork of Princeton University, serving as his doctoral adviser.

== Career ==
After completing his Ph.D., Sperber held a Lecturer position at University of Illinois from 1975 to 1977. Following this, he joined the University of Minnesota, starting as an Assistant Professor from 1977 to 1980. He was subsequently promoted to Associate Professor, a position he held from 1980 to 1983, and has served as a Professor since 1983.

== Research ==
In his doctoral thesis (1975) under Dwork, Sperber developed the p-adic cohomology for the family of multiple (n-variable) Kloosterman sums defined over a finite field of characteristic p. In particular, he related these sums to certain classical confluent hypergeometric differential equations. This relationship generalized the study due to Dwork, linking the one variable Kloosterman sums and its arithmetic properties to the p-adic Bessel function. The arithmetic information that Sperber's work produced included determining the degree of the associated L-function, proving a functional equation, and determining the precise p-adic size of the roots (or poles, depending on the parity of n) of the L-function.

From this work forward, Sperber's work focused on arithmetic properties of exponential sums and the study of p-adic differential equations. In a joint work with Sibuya, he studied power series solutions of an algebraic differential equation having coefficients in a number field. Their result showed that such series solutions have a nontrivial radius of convergence for any non-Archimedean valuation of the number field.

Sperber's work with Alan Adolphson has extended over a half-century. Together, they studied the L-functions associated with non-degenerate toric exponential sums over a finite field of characteristic p using p-adic cohomology. In the non-degenerate case, they were able to establish the vanishing of all but middle dimensional p-adic cohomology. From this, they extended the work to the cases of smooth projective hypersurfaces and complete intersections defined over a finite field, obtaining similar results in these cases for the interesting factor of their zeta functions. For exponential sums, they expressed the degree of the L-function (or its reciprocal) given in terms of the volume of the Newton polyhedron of the argument of the exponential sum. They also established that the Newton polygon of the L-function lies over its Hodge polygon, and proved the purity of roots in simplicial cases.

In related work, Adolphson and Sperber derived general results even without the hypothesis of non-degeneracy. They obtained estimates for the degree as a rational function and for total degree of the associated L-function for a toric exponential sum, using the p-adic method developed by Bombieri. They also derived (1987) estimates for the divisibility of the exponential sum by powers of p. These results were then extended to estimate the divisibility by powers of p of the number of solutions in a finite field of characteristics p of a finite system of polynomial equations defined over such a field. These results were a refinement and generalization of the Chevalley-Warning theorem.

In a series of articles, Adolphson and Sperber developed the p-adic theory of multiplicative character sums and the case of twisted exponential sums involving both multiplicative and additive characters of the underlying finite field of definition. In other works, they studied affine exponential sums and showed that in some cases, the pattern of vanishing p-adic cohomology holds even in the cases where nondegeneracy fails to hold. They generalized Igusa's seminal work, demonstrating that Hasse invariants may be realized in many settings in terms of the reduction mod p of the p-adically bounded solutions of the relevant, related A-hypergeometric systems. Moreover, they considered families of hypersurfaces defined by suitable deformations of a Calabi-Yau (or, more generally, a generalized Calabi-Yau) hypersurface and established a p-adic formula for the unique largest (p-adically) reciprocal root of the zeta function, which has the following form. If H_{$\overline{s}$} is an ordinary fiber of the family at _{$\overline{s}$} an element of the finite field and λ is a Teichmüller unit over _{$\overline{s}$}, then this distinguished reciprocal root is the value at λ of a ratio of p-adic exponential functions having classical significance.

In joint work with Doran, Kelly, Salerno, Voight, and Whitcher, Sperber studied an alternative construction of mirror symmetry to the example involving the Dwork family of hypersurfaces. Instead of the Dwork family, they considered various invertible polynomial families suggested by Berglund-Hübsch-Krawitz. Their results showed that in these cases, the interesting factor of the zeta function remains identical, suggesting an underlying arithmetic stability in the mirror correspondence.

Haessig and Sperber applied the methods used in the study of toric sums to quite general families of such sums, and particularly to their symmetric power L-functions. Their results include estimates for the degree of the L-function. In the case of generalized Kloosterman sums, they obtained arithmetic estimates and applied some of these method as well to infinite symmetric power L-functions, which carry information for the unit root L-function studied by Dwork and Fu-Wan.

Libgober and Sperber considered holomorphic functions from the n-fold complex torus to the complex numbers, defined by a Laurent polynomial. They introduced the zeta function of monodromy at ∞ and showed that, in the non-degenerate case, it closely agreed with the L-function of the exponential sums associated with this function when viewed over a finite field. In these non-degenerate cases, they also established a connection between certain arithmetic invariants that arose in analogous situations across two distinct mathematical contexts.

== Bibliography ==
=== Books ===
- p-Adic Methods in Number Theory and Algebraic Geometry (1992) ISBN 9780821851456

=== Selected articles ===
- Sperber, S. (1980). "Congruence properties of the hyperkloosterman sum". Compositio Mathematica. 42: 3–33.
- Sperber, Steven (1986). "On the p-adic Theory of Exponential Sums". American Journal of Mathematics. 108 (2): 255–296. doi:10.2307/2374675. JSTOR 2374675.
- Adolphson, Alan; Sperber, Steven (October 1987). "Newton polyhedra and the degree of the L-function associated to an exponential sum". Inventiones Mathematicae. 88 (3): 555–569. Bibcode:1987InMat..88..555A. doi:10.1007/BF01391831.
- Adolphson, Alan; Sperber, Steven (1989). "Exponential Sums and Newton Polyhedra: Cohomology and Estimates". Annals of Mathematics. 130 (2): 367–406. doi:10.2307/1971424. JSTOR 1971424.
- Libgober, A.; Sperber, S. (1995). "On the zeta function of monodromy of a polynomial map". Compositio Mathematica. 99: 287–307.
