= Crystal (mathematics) =

In mathematics, crystals are Cartesian sections of certain fibered categories. They were introduced by Alexander Grothendieck (1966a), who named them crystals because in some sense they are "rigid" and "grow". In particular quasicoherent crystals over the crystalline site are analogous to quasicoherent modules over a scheme.

An isocrystal is a crystal up to isogeny. They are $p$-adic analogues of $\mathbf{Q}_l$-adic étale sheaves, introduced by Grothendieck (1966a) and Berthelot & Ogus (1983) (though the definition of isocrystal only appears in part II of this paper by Ogus (1984)). Convergent isocrystals are a variation of isocrystals that work better over non-perfect fields, and overconvergent isocrystals are another variation related to overconvergent cohomology theories.

A Dieudonné crystal is a crystal with Verschiebung and Frobenius maps. An F-crystal is a structure in semilinear algebra somewhat related to crystals.

== Crystals over the infinitesimal and crystalline sites ==
The infinitesimal site $\text{Inf}(X/S)$ has as objects the infinitesimal extensions of open sets of $X$. If $X$ is a scheme over $S$ then the sheaf $O_{X/S}$ is defined by $O_{X/S}(T)$ = coordinate ring of $T$, where we write $T$ as an abbreviation for an object $U\to T$ of $\text{Inf}(X/S)$. Sheaves on this site grow in the sense that they can be extended from open sets to infinitesimal extensions of open sets.

A crystal on the site $\text{Inf}(X/S)$ is a sheaf $F$ of $O_{X/S}$ modules that is rigid in the following sense:

for any map $f$ between objects $T$, $T'$; of $\text{Inf}(X/S)$, the natural map from $f^* F(T)$ to $F(T')$ is an isomorphism.

This is similar to the definition of a quasicoherent sheaf of modules in the Zariski topology.

An example of a crystal is the sheaf $O_{X/S}$.

Crystals on the crystalline site are defined in a similar way.

== Crystals in fibered categories ==
In general, if $E$ is a fibered category over $F$, then a crystal is a cartesian section of the fibered category. In the special case when $F$ is the category of infinitesimal extensions of a scheme $X$ and $E$ the category of quasicoherent modules over objects of $F$, then crystals of this fibered category are the same as crystals of the infinitesimal site.
