= Supersingular prime =

In mathematics, a supersingular prime is a prime number satisfying one of the following concepts:

- Supersingular prime (algebraic number theory)
- Supersingular prime (moonshine theory)
