= Dieudonné module =

Module over the non-commutative Dieudonné ring

In mathematics, a Dieudonné module introduced by Jean Dieudonné (1954, 1957b), is a module over the non-commutative Dieudonné ring, which is generated over the ring of Witt vectors by two special endomorphisms $F$ and $V$ called the Frobenius and Verschiebung operators. They are used for studying finite flat commutative group schemes.

Finite flat commutative group schemes over a perfect field $k$ of positive characteristic $p$ can be studied by transferring their geometric structure to a (semi-)linear-algebraic setting. The basic object is the Dieudonné ring

$$D=W(k)\{F,V\}/(FV-p)$$,

which is a quotient of the ring of noncommutative polynomials, with coefficients in Witt vectors of $k$. The endomorphisms $F$ and $V$ are the Frobenius and Verschiebung operators, and they may act nontrivially on the Witt vectors. Dieudonné and Pierre Cartier constructed an antiequivalence of categories between finite commutative group schemes over $k$ of order a power of $p$ and modules over $D$ with finite $W(k)$-length. The Dieudonné module functor in one direction is given by homomorphisms into the abelian sheaf $CW$ of Witt co-vectors. This sheaf is more or less dual to the sheaf of Witt vectors (which is in fact representable by a group scheme), since it is constructed by taking a direct limit of finite length Witt vectors under successive Verschiebung maps $V\colon W_n \to W_{n+1}$, and then completing. Many properties of commutative group schemes can be seen by examining the corresponding Dieudonné modules, e.g., connected $p$-group schemes correspond to $D$-modules for which $F$ is nilpotent, and étale group schemes correspond to modules for which $F$ is an isomorphism.

Dieudonné theory exists in a somewhat more general setting than finite flat groups over a field. Tadao Oda's 1967 thesis gave a connection between Dieudonné modules and the first de Rham cohomology of abelian varieties, and at about the same time, Alexander Grothendieck suggested that there should be a crystalline version of the theory that could be used to analyze $p$-divisible groups. Galois actions on the group schemes transfer through the equivalences of categories, and the associated deformation theory of Galois representations was used in Andrew Wiles's work on the Shimura–Taniyama conjecture. Prismatic Dieudonné theory and crystalline Dieudonné theory are two sub-specializations of Dieudonné theory.

== Dieudonné rings ==
If $k$ is a perfect field of characteristic $p$, its ring of Witt vectors consists of sequences $(w_1,w_2,w_3,\dots)$ of elements of $k$, and has an endomorphism $\sigma$ induced by the Frobenius endomorphism of $k$, so $(w_1,w_2,w_3,\dots)^\sigma=(w^p_1,w^p_2,w^p_3,\dots)$. The Dieudonné ring, often denoted by $E_k$ or $D_k$, is the non-commutative ring over $W(k)$ generated by 2 elements $F$ and $V$ subject to the relations

$$FV = VF = p$$
$$Fw = w^\sigma F$$
$$wV = Vw^\sigma$$.

It is a $\mathbb{Z}$-graded ring, where the piece of degree ${n\in\mathbb{Z}}$ is a 1-dimensional free module over $W(k)$, spanned by $V^{-n}$ if $n\leq 0$ and by $F^n$ if $n\geq 0$.

Some authors define the Dieudonné ring to be the completion of the ring above for the ideal generated by $F$ and $V$.

== Dieudonné modules and groups ==
Special sorts of modules over the Dieudonné ring correspond to certain algebraic group schemes. For example, finite length modules over the Dieudonné ring form an abelian category equivalent to the opposite of the category of finite commutative $p$-group schemes over $k$.

== Examples ==
- If $X$ is the constant group scheme $\mathbb{Z}/p\mathbb{Z}$ over $k$, then its corresponding Dieudonné module $\mathbf{D}(X)$ is $k$ with $F = \mathrm{Frob}_k$ and $V = 0$.
- For the scheme of $p$-th roots of unity $X = \mu_p$, then its corresponding Dieudonné module is $\mathbf{D}(X) = k$ with $F = 0$ and $V = \mathrm{Frob}_k^{-1}$.
- For $X = \alpha_p$, defined as the kernel of the Frobenius $\mathbb{G}_{a} \to \mathbb{G}_{a}$, the Dieudonné module is $\mathbf{D}(X) = k$ with $F = V = 0$.
- If $X = E[p]$ is the $p$-torsion of an elliptic curve over $k$ (with $p$-torsion in $k$), then the Dieudonné module depends on whether $E$ is supersingular or not.

== Dieudonné–Manin classification theorem ==
The Dieudonné–Manin classification theorem was proved by Dieudonné (1955) and Yuri Manin (1963). It describes the structure of Dieudonné modules over an algebraically closed field $k$ up to "isogeny". More precisely, it classifies the finitely generated modules over $D_k[1/p]$, where $D_k$ is the Dieudonné ring. The category of such modules is semisimple, so every module is a direct sum of simple modules. The simple modules are the modules $E_{s/r}$ where $r$ and $s$ are coprime integers with $r>0$. The module $E_{s/r}$ has a basis over $W(k)[1/p]$ of the form $v, Fv, F^2 v,\dots, F^{r-1}v$ for some element $v$, and $F^r v=p^s v$. The rational number $s/r$ is called the slope of the module.

== The Dieudonné module of a group scheme ==
If $G$ is a commutative group scheme, its Dieudonné module $D(G)$ is defined to be $\text{Hom}(G,W)$, defined as $\lim_n\text{Hom}(G,W_n)$ where $W$ is the formal Witt group scheme and $W_n$ is the truncated Witt group scheme of Witt vectors of length $n$.

The Dieudonné module gives antiequivalences between various sorts of commutative group schemes and left modules over the Dieudonné ring $D$.

- Finite commutative group schemes of $p$-power order correspond to $D$ modules that have finite length over $W$.
- Unipotent affine commutative group schemes correspond to $D$ modules that are $V$-torsion.
- $p$-divisible groups correspond to $D$-modules that are finitely generated free $W$-modules, at least over perfect fields.

== Dieudonné crystal ==
A Dieudonné crystal is a crystal $D$ together with homomorphisms $F:D^p\to D$ and $V:D\to D^p$ satisfying the relations $VF=p$ (on $D^p$), $FV=p$ (on $D$). Dieudonné crystals were introduced by Grothendieck (1966) and were developed in depth by Berthelot, Breen and Messing using crystalline cohomology. They play the same role for classifying algebraic groups over schemes that Dieudonné modules play for classifying algebraic groups over fields. Very recently, the notion of prismatic cohomology (due to Bhatt and Scholze) has been used by Anschütz-Le Bras, Madapusi-Mondal, and Mondal to obtain generalisations of the notion of Dieudonné crystal in mixed characteristic.
