= List of things named after Ernst Witt =

These are things named after Ernst Witt, a German mathematician.

- Bourbaki–Witt theorem
- Hall–Witt identity
- Hasse–Witt matrix
  - Hasse–Witt invariant
- Poincaré–Birkhoff–Witt theorem, usually known as the PBW theorem
- Shirshov–Witt theorem
- Witt algebra
- Witt decomposition
- Witt design (Witt geometry)
- Witt group
- Witt index
- Witt polynomial
- Witt ring
  - Grothendieck-Witt ring
- Witt scheme
- Witt's theorem
- Witt vector
  - Witt vector cohomology
