= Monsky–Washnitzer cohomology =

Mathematic theory

In algebraic geometry and p-adic analysis, Monsky–Washnitzer cohomology is a p-adic cohomology theory for smooth affine varieties over fields of positive characteristic. Introduced by Paul Monsky and Gerard Washnitzer in 1968, the theory associates characteristic-zero cohomology groups to algebraic varieties defined in positive characteristic.

The construction was motivated by the work of Bernard Dwork on the rationality of zeta functions of algebraic varieties over finite fields. It uses liftings of smooth affine algebras to characteristic zero, together with a weak completion that permits certain convergent infinite power series.

Monsky–Washnitzer cohomology may be regarded as a p-adic analogue of algebraic de Rham cohomology. Unlike ordinary algebraic de Rham cohomology in positive characteristic, it produces finite-dimensional vector spaces over a field of characteristic zero for smooth affine varieties of finite type.

The construction was subsequently simplified by Marius van der Put and was generalized to more general varieties through rigid cohomology, developed by Pierre Berthelot.

== Mathematical background ==
=== Varieties in positive characteristic ===
Let $k$ be a perfect field of characteristic $p>0$, and let

$$X=\operatorname{Spec}(A_0)$$

be a smooth affine scheme of finite type over $k$.

Here $A_0$ is a finitely generated smooth commutative $k$-algebra.

The ordinary algebraic de Rham complex is

$$0\longrightarrow A_0
\xrightarrow{\ d\ }
\Omega_{A_0/k}^{1}
\xrightarrow{\ d\ }
\Omega_{A_0/k}^{2}
\xrightarrow{\ d\ }\cdots,$$

where $\Omega_{A_0/k}^{i}$ denotes the module of algebraic differential forms of degree $i$.

Its cohomology is

$$H_{dR}^{i}(A_0/k)
=
H^{i}(\Omega_{A_0/k}^{\bullet}).$$

In characteristic $p$, the ordinary de Rham complex behaves differently from its characteristic-zero counterpart.

For example, if $A_0=k[x]$, then

$$d(x^p)=px^{p-1}dx=0.$$

Consequently, the derivative of a nonconstant polynomial may vanish.

This phenomenon produces additional de Rham cohomology classes and prevents ordinary algebraic de Rham cohomology from serving directly as a characteristic-zero Weil cohomology theory for smooth affine varieties.

Monsky–Washnitzer cohomology addresses this difficulty by constructing a differential complex over a characteristic-zero coefficient field.

== Witt vectors and characteristic-zero liftings ==
Let

$$W=W(k)$$

denote the ring of Witt vectors of the perfect field $k$.

The ring $W$ is a complete discrete valuation ring with uniformizer $p$ and residue field $k$.

Thus

$$W/pW\cong k.$$

Let

$$K=\operatorname{Frac}(W)$$

be its fraction field.

When $k=\mathbb F_p$,

$$W(\mathbb F_p)=\mathbb Z_p,
\qquad
K=\mathbb Q_p.$$

The first step in the Monsky–Washnitzer construction is to choose a smooth $W$-algebra $A$ satisfying

$$A/pA\cong A_0.$$

Such an algebra is called a smooth lifting of $A_0$ to characteristic zero.

For smooth affine algebras over a perfect field, suitable smooth liftings exist.

The lifting need not be unique, but the resulting Monsky–Washnitzer cohomology groups are independent of its choice up to canonical isomorphism.

== Weak completion ==
=== Motivation ===
The ordinary p-adic completion of an algebra is often too large for the desired cohomology theory.

For example, the p-adic completion of the polynomial algebra

$$W[x_1,\ldots,x_n]$$

contains restricted power series whose coefficients tend to zero p-adically.

Monsky–Washnitzer cohomology instead uses a smaller algebra of overconvergent power series, called the weak completion or dagger algebra.

The overconvergence condition provides stronger analytic control than ordinary p-adic convergence.

=== Definition of the dagger algebra ===
Let

$$P=W[x_1,\ldots,x_n].$$

The weak completion $P^\dagger$ consists of series

$$f=\sum_{\nu\in\mathbb N^n}a_\nu x^\nu$$

with coefficients $a_\nu\in W$ satisfying a linear growth condition on their p-adic valuations.

More precisely, there must exist real constants $c>0$ and $C$ such that

$$v_p(a_\nu)\geq c|\nu|-C$$

for every multi-index $\nu$, where

$$|\nu|=\nu_1+\cdots+\nu_n.$$

The resulting algebra is denoted

$$W\langle x_1,\ldots,x_n\rangle^\dagger.$$

Equivalently, its elements are restricted power series that converge on some closed p-adic polydisc of radius strictly greater than one.

If $A=P/I$ is a finitely generated $W$-algebra, its weak completion is

$$A^\dagger
=
P^\dagger/IP^\dagger.$$

This construction is independent of the chosen finite presentation, up to canonical isomorphism.

The algebra $A^\dagger$ is the principal algebraic object used in Monsky–Washnitzer cohomology.

=== Comparison with ordinary completion ===
Let $\widehat A$ denote the ordinary p-adic completion of $A$.

There is a natural homomorphism

$$A^\dagger\longrightarrow\widehat A.$$

For polynomial algebras, the weak completion is a proper subalgebra of the ordinary completion.

The difference is that weak completion imposes a positive linear lower bound on the valuations of coefficients, while ordinary restricted power series require only that the coefficients tend to zero p-adically.

This distinction is essential in the construction of finite-dimensional cohomology groups.

== Continuous differential forms ==
Let $A^\dagger$ be the weak completion of a smooth lifting of $A_0$.

The ordinary module of Kähler differentials of $A^\dagger$ is replaced by the module of continuous differentials appropriate to the weakly complete topology.

Denote this module by

$$\Omega_{A^\dagger/W}^{1}.$$

The universal derivation is

$$d:A^\dagger\longrightarrow
\Omega_{A^\dagger/W}^{1}.$$

For higher degrees, define

$$\Omega_{A^\dagger/W}^{i}
=
\bigwedge_{A^\dagger}^{i}
\Omega_{A^\dagger/W}^{1}.$$

The exterior derivative extends to maps

$$d:\Omega_{A^\dagger/W}^{i}
\longrightarrow
\Omega_{A^\dagger/W}^{i+1}$$

satisfying

$$d^2=0.$$

This produces the weakly completed de Rham complex

$$0\longrightarrow A^\dagger
\xrightarrow{\ d\ }
\Omega_{A^\dagger/W}^{1}
\xrightarrow{\ d\ }
\Omega_{A^\dagger/W}^{2}
\xrightarrow{\ d\ }\cdots.$$

After tensoring with $K$, one obtains a complex of $K$-vector spaces:

$$\Omega_{A^\dagger/W}^{\bullet}
\otimes_W K.$$

== Definition of Monsky–Washnitzer cohomology ==
Let $X=\operatorname{Spec}(A_0)$ be a smooth affine scheme of finite type over a perfect field $k$ of characteristic $p>0$.

Choose a smooth lifting $A$ over $W(k)$ and form its weak completion $A^\dagger$.

The Monsky–Washnitzer cohomology groups of $X$ are defined by

$$H_{MW}^{i}(X/K)
=
H^i\left(
\Omega_{A^\dagger/W}^{\bullet}
\otimes_W K
\right).$$

Here $K=\operatorname{Frac}(W(k))$.

Thus

$$H_{MW}^{i}(X/K)
=
\frac{
\ker(d:\Omega^i\otimes_W K
\to\Omega^{i+1}\otimes_W K)
}{
\operatorname{im}(d:\Omega^{i-1}\otimes_W K
\to\Omega^i\otimes_W K)
},$$

where $\Omega^i$ abbreviates the continuous differential module $\Omega_{A^\dagger/W}^{i}$.

The construction may be represented by

$$\begin{array}{ccccc}
A_0&\longleftarrow&A&\longrightarrow&A^\dagger\\
&&&&\downarrow\\
&&&&\Omega_{A^\dagger/W}^{\bullet}\\
&&&&\downarrow\otimes_W K\\
&&&&\Omega_{A^\dagger/W}^{\bullet}\otimes_W K\\
&&&&\downarrow H^i\\
&&&&H_{MW}^{i}(X/K).
\end{array}$$

== Independence of the lifting ==
A fundamental theorem of Monsky–Washnitzer theory states that the cohomology groups do not depend on the chosen smooth lifting.

Theorem. Let $A$ and $B$ be two smooth liftings of the same smooth affine $k$-algebra $A_0$.

Then their weakly completed de Rham complexes have canonically isomorphic cohomology groups after tensoring with $K$:

$$H^i(\Omega_{A^\dagger/W}^{\bullet}\otimes_W K)
\cong
H^i(\Omega_{B^\dagger/W}^{\bullet}\otimes_W K).$$

The isomorphism is compatible with morphisms of smooth affine varieties.

=== Outline of the argument ===
The proof uses the lifting properties of smooth algebras and a homotopy-invariance result for weakly complete differential complexes.

A morphism between the reductions of two smooth weakly complete algebras can be lifted to a homomorphism between their weak completions.

Different choices of lifting induce chain-homotopic maps on the associated de Rham complexes after inverting $p$.

Consequently, the induced maps on cohomology are independent of the chosen lifting.

If two smooth liftings represent the same reduction, the comparison maps induce inverse isomorphisms on cohomology.

This establishes the intrinsic nature of Monsky–Washnitzer cohomology.

== Functoriality ==
Let

$$f:X\longrightarrow Y$$

be a morphism of smooth affine varieties over $k$.

Because the construction is contravariant, $f$ induces a pullback

$$f^*:H_{MW}^{i}(Y/K)
\longrightarrow
H_{MW}^{i}(X/K).$$

For composable morphisms

$$X\xrightarrow{f}Y\xrightarrow{g}Z,$$

the induced maps satisfy

$$(g\circ f)^*=f^*\circ g^*.$$

The identity morphism induces the identity map:

$$(\operatorname{id}_X)^*
=
\operatorname{id}_{H_{MW}^{i}(X/K)}.$$

The contravariant behavior is represented by

$$\begin{array}{ccccc}
X&\xrightarrow{\ f\ }&Y&\xrightarrow{\ g\ }&Z\\
H_{MW}^{i}(X/K)&\xleftarrow{\ f^*\ }&
H_{MW}^{i}(Y/K)&\xleftarrow{\ g^*\ }&
H_{MW}^{i}(Z/K).
\end{array}$$

== Frobenius action ==
Suppose that $k=\mathbb F_q$, where $q=p^r$.

The absolute q-power Frobenius on the coordinate algebra is

$$F_q:A_0\longrightarrow A_0,
\qquad
a\longmapsto a^q.$$

The Frobenius can be lifted to the weakly completed algebra in the appropriate p-adic setting.

After passing to cohomology, this produces a K-linear endomorphism

$$F_q^*:H_{MW}^{i}(X/K)
\longrightarrow
H_{MW}^{i}(X/K).$$

For a general perfect field $k$, the p-power Frobenius acts semilinearly with respect to the Witt-vector Frobenius on $K$.

In the finite-field case, the q-power Frobenius acts linearly because the corresponding r-fold Witt-vector Frobenius is the identity on $W(\mathbb F_q)$.

The induced Frobenius action is independent of the chosen lift.

=== Frobenius and the differential ===
A Frobenius lift acts on differential forms by pullback.

For a differential form $\omega$,

$$F^*(d\omega)=d(F^*\omega).$$

Thus Frobenius defines a chain map of the weakly completed de Rham complex.

The compatibility can be expressed by the commutative diagram

$$\begin{array}{ccc}
\Omega^i&\xrightarrow{\ d\ }&\Omega^{i+1}\\
\downarrow F^*&&\downarrow F^*\\
\Omega^i&\xrightarrow{\ d\ }&\Omega^{i+1}.
\end{array}$$

After taking cohomology, the Frobenius pullback becomes an endomorphism of each Monsky–Washnitzer cohomology group.

== Finite-dimensionality ==
Theorem. If $X$ is a smooth affine variety of finite type over a perfect field $k$, then

$$\dim_K H_{MW}^{i}(X/K)<\infty$$

for every $i$.

Furthermore, if $X$ has dimension $n$, then

$$H_{MW}^{i}(X/K)=0$$

for $i>n$.

The vanishing follows from the fact that the module of continuous differential one-forms is locally free of rank $n$ for a smooth lifting.

Consequently,

$$\Omega_{A^\dagger/W}^{i}=0$$

for $i>n$.

The finite-dimensionality theorem is a deeper result and depends on the overconvergent nature of the weak completion.

== Cup product ==
The exterior product of differential forms induces a multiplication on Monsky–Washnitzer cohomology.

For closed forms

$$\alpha\in\Omega^i\otimes_W K,
\qquad
\beta\in\Omega^j\otimes_W K,$$

their wedge product satisfies

$$d(\alpha\wedge\beta)
=
d\alpha\wedge\beta+
(-1)^i\alpha\wedge d\beta.$$

If both forms are closed, then

$$d(\alpha\wedge\beta)=0.$$

Changing either representative by an exact form changes the product by an exact form.

Therefore the wedge product induces

$$H_{MW}^{i}(X/K)\otimes_K
H_{MW}^{j}(X/K)
\longrightarrow
H_{MW}^{i+j}(X/K).$$

The product is graded-commutative:

$$[\alpha]\smile[\beta]
=
(-1)^{ij}[\beta]\smile[\alpha].$$

Thus

$$H_{MW}^{*}(X/K)
=
\bigoplus_{i\geq0}H_{MW}^{i}(X/K)$$

is a graded-commutative $K$-algebra.

== Example: The affine line ==
Let

$$X=\mathbb A_k^1
=
\operatorname{Spec}(k[x]).$$

Choose the smooth lifting

$$A=W[x].$$

Its weak completion is

$$A^\dagger=W\langle x\rangle^\dagger.$$

The differential complex is

$$0\longrightarrow A^\dagger\otimes_W K
\xrightarrow{\ d\ }
(A^\dagger\otimes_W K)\,dx
\longrightarrow0.$$

The zeroth cohomology consists of elements whose derivative vanishes.

Since the coefficient field has characteristic zero,

$$H_{MW}^{0}(\mathbb A_k^1/K)\cong K.$$

To compute the first cohomology, consider a one-form

$$\omega=f(x)\,dx.$$

Write

$$f(x)=\sum_{n\geq0}a_nx^n.$$

Formally, a primitive is

$$g(x)=
\sum_{n\geq0}
\frac{a_n}{n+1}x^{n+1}.$$

The denominators $n+1$ may have positive p-adic valuation, but their valuations grow at most logarithmically with $n$.

The linear overconvergence condition on the coefficients $a_n$ therefore remains valid after integration, possibly with a smaller positive growth constant.

Thus $g$ remains overconvergent and

$$dg=\omega.$$

Consequently,

$$H_{MW}^{1}(\mathbb A_k^1/K)=0.$$

All higher groups vanish because the affine line has dimension one.

Hence

$$H_{MW}^{i}(\mathbb A_k^1/K)
\cong
\begin{cases}
K,&i=0,\\
0,&i>0.
\end{cases}$$

== Example: The multiplicative group ==
Let

$$X=\mathbb G_{m,k}
=
\operatorname{Spec}(k[x,x^{-1}]).$$

Choose the smooth lifting

$$A=W[x,x^{-1}].$$

The weakly completed de Rham complex contains the logarithmic differential

$$\frac{dx}{x}.$$

This one-form is closed because

$$d\left(\frac{dx}{x}\right)=0.$$

It is not exact in the overconvergent de Rham complex.

Indeed, an antiderivative would require a logarithm of $x$, which is not a globally defined element of the dagger algebra of the multiplicative group.

Therefore

$$\left[\frac{dx}{x}\right]$$

defines a nonzero class in first Monsky–Washnitzer cohomology.

In fact,

$$H_{MW}^{0}(\mathbb G_{m,k}/K)\cong K$$

and

$$H_{MW}^{1}(\mathbb G_{m,k}/K)
\cong
K\left[\frac{dx}{x}\right].$$

All higher cohomology groups vanish.

Thus

$$\dim_K H_{MW}^{0}(\mathbb G_m/K)=1,
\qquad
\dim_K H_{MW}^{1}(\mathbb G_m/K)=1.$$

=== Frobenius on the multiplicative group ===
The q-power Frobenius sends

$$x\longmapsto x^q.$$

Therefore

$$F_q^*\left(\frac{dx}{x}\right)
=
\frac{d(x^q)}{x^q}
=
q\frac{dx}{x}.$$

Hence Frobenius acts on the first cohomology group by multiplication by $q$:

$$F_q^*
\left[\frac{dx}{x}\right]
=
q\left[\frac{dx}{x}\right].$$

This provides an explicit example of a Frobenius eigenvalue in p-adic cohomology.

== Relationship with rigid cohomology ==
Rigid cohomology, developed by Pierre Berthelot, generalizes Monsky–Washnitzer cohomology to varieties that need not be smooth or affine.

For a smooth affine variety $X$ over a perfect field $k$, there is a canonical comparison isomorphism

$$H_{MW}^{i}(X/K)
\cong
H_{\mathrm{rig}}^{i}(X/K).$$

Rigid cohomology is constructed using overconvergent differential forms on suitable rigid-analytic neighborhoods of a variety embedded in a formal scheme.

The dagger algebra of Monsky–Washnitzer theory corresponds to an algebraic description of overconvergent functions in this setting.

The comparison identifies the Monsky–Washnitzer construction with the affine smooth case of rigid cohomology.

== Zeta functions and Frobenius ==
Let $X$ be a variety over the finite field $\mathbb F_q$.

Its Hasse–Weil zeta function is defined by

$$Z(X,t)
=
\exp\left(
\sum_{r\geq1}
\frac{\#X(\mathbb F_{q^r})}{r}t^r
\right).$$

For smooth affine varieties, Monsky–Washnitzer cohomology provides a p-adic cohomological framework for studying the Frobenius action underlying point-counting formulas.

In the rigid cohomology formulation, the cohomological trace formula uses compactly supported cohomology:

$$\#X(\mathbb F_{q^r})
=
\sum_i(-1)^i
\operatorname{Tr}
\left(
F^r\mid H_{\mathrm{rig},c}^{i}(X/K)
\right),$$

where $F$ denotes the appropriate arithmetic Frobenius operator in the chosen convention.

Equivalently, with compatible Frobenius conventions,

$$Z(X,t)
=
\prod_i
\det\left(
1-tF\mid H_{\mathrm{rig},c}^{i}(X/K)
\right)^{(-1)^{i+1}}.$$

The use of compact supports is important for nonproper varieties.

The relationship between Frobenius eigenvalues and point counts was a central motivation for the development of p-adic cohomology theories.

== See also ==
- Rigid cohomology
- Crystalline cohomology
- Algebraic de Rham cohomology
- p-adic number
- Witt vector
- Frobenius endomorphism
- Hasse–Weil zeta function
- Dwork's theorem
- Kähler differential
- Rigid analytic geometry
