= P-adic cohomology =

In mathematics, p-adic cohomology means a cohomology theory for varieties of characteristic p whose values are modules over a ring of p-adic integers. Examples (in roughly historical order) include:

- Serre's Witt vector cohomology
- Monsky–Washnitzer cohomology
- Infinitesimal cohomology
- Crystalline cohomology
- Rigid cohomology
- Prismatic cohomology
- Habiro cohomology
- Deninger cohomology

== See also ==
- p-adic Hodge theory
- Étale cohomology, taking values over a ring of l-adic integers for l≠p
