= Bhargav Bhatt =

Bhargav Bhatt may refer to:

- Bhargav Bhatt (cricketer) (born 1990), Indian cricketer
- Bhargav Bhatt (mathematician) (born 1983), Indian-American mathematician
