= James Milne (mathematician) =

New Zealand mathematician

James S. Milne (born 10 October 1942) is a New Zealand mathematician working in arithmetic geometry.

== Life ==
Milne attended high school in Invercargill in New Zealand until 1959, and then studied at the University of Otago in Dunedin (B.A. 1964) and Harvard University (Masters 1966, Ph.D. 1967 under John Tate). From then to 1969 he was a lecturer at University College London. After that he was at the University of Michigan, as Assistant Professor (1969–1972), Associate Professor (1972–1977), Professor (1977–2000), and Professor Emeritus (since 2000). He has also been a visiting professor at King's College London, at the Institut des hautes études scientifiques in Paris (1975, 1978), at the Mathematical Sciences Research Institute in Berkeley, California (1986–87), and the Institute for Advanced Study in Princeton, New Jersey (1976–77, 1982, 1988).

In his dissertation, entitled "The conjectures of Birch and Swinnerton-Dyer for constant abelian varieties over function fields," he proved the conjecture of Birch and Swinnerton–Dyer for constant abelian varieties over function fields in one variable over a finite field. He also gave the first examples of nonzero abelian varieties with finite Tate–Shafarevich group. He went on to study Shimura varieties (certain hermitian symmetric spaces, low-dimensional examples being modular curves) and motives.

For 2025 Milne was awarded the Leroy P. Steele Prize for Mathematical Exposition of the American Mathematical Society.

His students include Piotr Blass, Michael Bester, Matthew DeLong, Pierre Giguere, William Hawkins Jr, Matthias Pfau, Victor Scharaschkin, Stefan Treatman, Anthony Vazzana, and Wafa Wei.

Milne is also an avid mountain climber.

== Writings ==
- Étale Cohomology. Princeton Mathematical Series. Vol. 33. Princeton, NJ: Princeton University Press. 1980. ISBN 0-691-08238-3. MR 0559531.
- Abelian Varieties, Jacobian Varieties, in Arithmetic Geometry Proc. Conference Storrs 1984, Springer 1986
- With Pierre Deligne, Arthur Ogus, Kuang-yen Shih, Hodge Cycles, Motives and Shimura Varieties, Springer Verlag, Lecture Notes in Mathematics vol. 900, 1982 (therein by Deligne: Tannakian Categories)
- Arithmetic Duality Theorems, Academic Press, Perspectives in Mathematics, 1986
- Editor with Laurent Clozel, Automorphic Forms, Shimura Varieties and L-Functions, 2 volumes, Elsevier 1988 (Conference University of Michigan, 1988)
- Elliptic Curves, BookSurge Publishing 2006
- Shimura Varieties and Motives in Jannsen, Kleiman, Serre (editor) motif, Proc. Symp. Pure vol. 55 Math, AMS, 1994
