= Askold Khovanskii =

Russian and Canadian mathematician (born 1947)

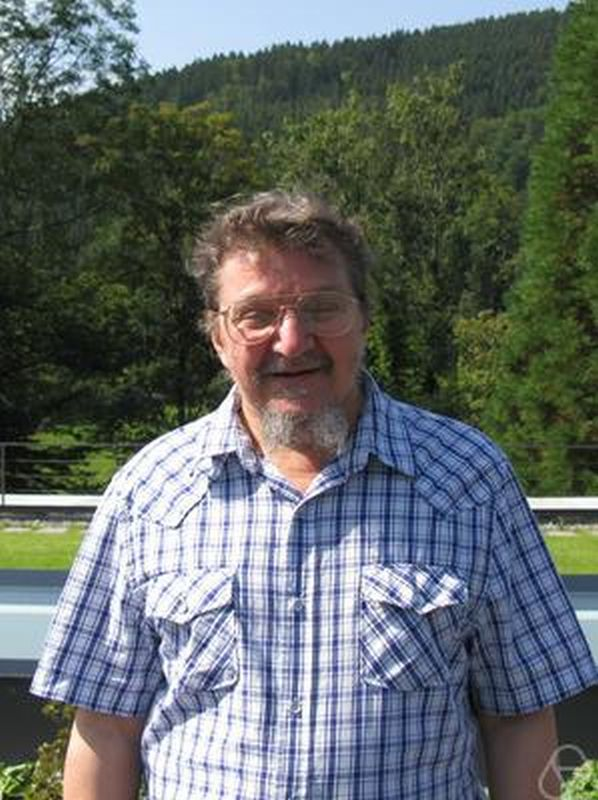
- Born: 3 June 1947 (age 79); Moscow, Russian SFSR, Soviet Union
- Education: Moscow State University; Steklov Mathematical Institute
- Known for: Fewnomial theory, Bernstein–Khovanskii–Kushnirenko theorem, Newton polyhedra theory, toric varieties, Lawrence–Khovanskii–Pukhlikov theorem, topological Galois theory
- Awards: Jeffery–Williams Prize (2014)
- Scientific career
- Fields: Mathematics
- Workplaces: University of Toronto; Independent University of Moscow
- Thesis: Representability of Function in Quadratures (1973)
- Doctoral advisor: Vladimir Arnold

Askold Georgievich Khovanskii FRSC (Russian: Аскольд Георгиевич Хованский; born 3 June 1947) is a Russian-Canadian mathematician currently at the University of Toronto. His areas of research are algebraic geometry, commutative algebra, singularity theory, differential geometry and differential equations. His research is in the development of the theory of toric varieties and Newton polyhedra in algebraic geometry. He is also the inventor of the theory of fewnomials, and the Bernstein–Khovanskii–Kushnirenko theorem is named after him.

He obtained his Ph.D. in 1973 from the Steklov Mathematical Institute in Moscow under the supervision of Vladimir Arnold. In his Ph.D. thesis, he developed a topological version of Galois theory. He studied the theory of Newton–Okounkov bodies.

Among his graduate students are Olga Gel'fond, Feodor Borodich, H. Petrov-Tan'kin, Kiumars Kaveh, Farzali Izadi, Ivan Soprunov, Jenya Soprunova, Vladlen Timorin, Valentina Kirichenko, Sergey Chulkov, V. Kisunko, Mikhail Mazin, O. Ivrii, K. Matveev, Yuri Burda, and J. Yang.

In 2014, he received the Jeffery–Williams Prize of the Canadian Mathematical Society for outstanding contributions to mathematical research in Canada. He was elected to the Royal Society of Canada in 2020.
