= Sparse polynomial =

In mathematics, a sparse polynomial (also lacunary polynomial or fewnomial) is a polynomial that has far fewer terms than its degree and number of variables would suggest. For example, $x^{10} + 3x^3 + 1$ is a sparse polynomial, as it is a trinomial with a degree of $10$.

The motivation for studying sparse polynomials is to concentrate on the structure of a polynomial's monomials instead of its degree, as one can see, for instance, by comparing Bernstein–Kushnirenko theorem with Bézout's theorem. Research on sparse polynomials has also included work on algorithms whose running time grows as a function of the number of terms rather than on the degree, for problems including polynomial multiplication, division, root-finding algorithms, and polynomial greatest common divisors. Sparse polynomials have also been used in pure mathematics, especially in the study of Galois groups, because it has been easier to determine the Galois groups of certain families of sparse polynomials than it is for other polynomials.

The algebraic varieties determined by sparse polynomials have a simple structure, which is also reflected in the structure of the solutions of certain related differential equations. Additionally, a sparse positivstellensatz exists for univariate sparse polynomials. It states that the non-negativity of a polynomial can be certified by SOS polynomials whose degree only depends on the number of monomials of the polynomial.

Sparse polynomials often come up in sum or difference of powers equations. The sum of two cubes states that $(x + y)(x^2 - xy + y^2) = x^3 + y^3$. Here $x^3 + y^3$ is a sparse polynomial, since out of the $16$ possible terms, only $2$ appear. Other examples include the identities $(x - y) \sum_{k=0}^{N-1} x^k y^{N-1-k} = x^N - y^N$ and also $(x + y) \sum_{k=0}^{2n}(-1)^k x^k y^{2n-k} = x^{2n+1} + y^{2n+1},$ where the product of two polynomials give a sparse polynomial. The Bring–Jerrard normal form of a quintic, $x^5 + px + q,$ is also a sparse polynomial.

== See also ==
- Askold Khovanskii, one of the main contributors to the theory of fewnomials.
