= Newton polygon =

Tool for solving polynomial equations

In mathematics, the Newton polygon is a tool for understanding the behaviour of polynomials over local fields, or more generally, over ultrametric fields. In the original case, the ultrametric field of interest was essentially the field of formal Laurent series in the indeterminate X, i.e. the field of fractions of the formal power series ring $K[[X]]$, over $K$, where $K$ was the real number or complex number field. This is still of considerable utility with respect to Puiseux expansions. The Newton polygon is an effective device for understanding the leading terms $aX^r$ of the power series expansion solutions to equations $P(F(X)) = 0$ where $P$ is a polynomial with coefficients in $K[X]$, the polynomial ring; that is, implicitly defined algebraic functions. The exponents $r$ here are certain rational numbers, depending on the branch chosen; and the solutions themselves are power series in $K[[Y]]$ with $Y = X^{1/d}$ for a denominator $d$ corresponding to the branch. The Newton polygon gives an effective, algorithmic approach to calculating $d$.

After the introduction of the p-adic numbers, it was shown that the Newton polygon is just as useful in questions of ramification for local fields, and hence in algebraic number theory. Newton polygons have also been useful in the study of elliptic curves.

== Definition ==
Construction of the Newton polygon of the polynomial 1 + 5 X + 1/5 X^{2} + 35 X^{3} + 25 X^{5} + 625 X^{6} with respect to the 5-adic valuation.

A priori, given a polynomial over a field, the behaviour of the roots (assuming it has roots) will be unknown. Newton polygons provide one technique for the study of the behaviour of the roots.

Let $K$ be a field endowed with a non-archimedean valuation $v_K: K \to \mathbb R\cup \{ \infty \}$, and let

$$f(x) = a_n x^n + \cdots + a_1 x + a_0 \in K[x],$$

with $a_0 a_n \ne 0$. Then the Newton polygon of $f$ is defined to be the lower boundary of the convex hull of the set of points $P_i=\left(i,v_K(a_i)\right),$ ignoring the points with $a_i = 0$.

Restated geometrically, plot all of these points P_{i} on the xy-plane. Let's assume that the points indices increase from left to right (P_{0} is the leftmost point, P_{n} is the rightmost point). Then, starting at P_{0}, draw a ray straight down parallel with the y-axis, and rotate this ray counter-clockwise until it hits the point P_{k_{1}} (not necessarily P_{1}). Break the ray here. Now draw a second ray from P_{k_{1}} straight down parallel with the y-axis, and rotate this ray counter-clockwise until it hits the point P_{k_{2}}. Continue until the process reaches the point P_{n}; the resulting polygon (containing the points P_{0}, P_{k_{1}}, P_{k_{2}}, ..., P_{k_{m}}, P_{n}) is the Newton polygon.

Another, perhaps more intuitive way to view this process is this : consider a rubber band surrounding all the points P_{0}, ..., P_{n}. Stretch the band upwards, such that the band is stuck on its lower side by some of the points (the points act like nails, partially hammered into the xy plane). The vertices of the Newton polygon are exactly those points.

For a neat diagram of this see Cassels 1986, chapter 6, §3.

== Main theorem ==
With the notations in the previous section, the main result concerning the Newton polygon is the following theorem, which states that the valuation of the roots of $f$ are entirely determined by its Newton polygon:

Let $\mu_1, \mu_2, \ldots, \mu_r$ be the slopes of the line segments of the Newton polygon of $f(x)$ (as defined above) arranged in increasing order, and let $\lambda_1, \lambda_2, \ldots, \lambda_r$ be the corresponding lengths of the line segments projected onto the x-axis (i.e. if we have a line segment stretching between the points $P_i$ and $P_j$ then the length is $j-i$).

- The $\mu_i$ are distinct;
- $\sum_i \lambda_i = n$;
- if $\alpha$ is a root of $f$ in $K$, $v(\alpha) \in \{-\mu_1, \ldots , -\mu_r\}$;
- for every $i$, the number of roots of $f$ whose valuations are equal to $-\mu_i$ (counting multiplicities) is at most $\lambda_i$, with equality if $f$ splits into the product of linear factors over $K$.

== Corollaries and applications ==
With the notation of the previous sections, we denote by $L$ the splitting field of $f$ over $K$, and by $v_L$ an extension of $v_K$ to $L$.

The Newton polygon theorem is often used to show the irreducibility of polynomials, as in the next corollary for example:

- Suppose that the valuation $v$ is discrete and normalized, and that the Newton polynomial of $f$ contains only one segment whose slope is $\mu$ and projection on the x-axis is $\lambda$. If $\mu = a/n$, with $a$ coprime to $n$, then $f$ is irreducible over $K$. In particular, since the Newton polygon of an Eisenstein polynomial consists of a single segment of slope $-1/n$ connecting $(0,1)$ and $(n,0)$, the Eisenstein criterion follows.

Indeed, by the main theorem, if $\alpha$ is a root of $f$, $v_L(\alpha) = -a/n.$ If $f$ were not irreducible over $K$, then the degree $d$ of $\alpha$ would be $< n$, and there would hold $v_L(\alpha) \in {1\over d}\mathbb Z$. But this is impossible since $v_L(\alpha) = -a/n$ with $a$ coprime to $n$.

Another corollary is the following:

- Assume that $(K, v_K)$ is Henselian. If the Newton polygon of $f$ fulfills $\lambda_i = 1$ for some $i$, then $f$ has a root in $K$.

More generally, the following factorization theorem holds:

- Assume that $(K, v_K)$ is Henselian. Then $f = A\,f_1\, f_2\cdots f_r,$, where $A\in K$, $f_i\in K[X]$ is monic for every $i$, the roots of $f_i$ are of valuation $-\mu_i$, and $\deg(f_i) = \lambda_i$.

Moreover, $\mu_i = v_K(f_i(0))/\lambda_i$, and if $v_K(f_i(0))$ is coprime to $\lambda_i$, $f_i$ is irreducible over $K$.

The following constitutes a test for the reducibility of polynomials over Henselian fields:

- Assume that $(K, v_K)$ is Henselian. If the Newton polygon does not reduce to a single segment $(\mu, \lambda),$ then $f$ is reducible over $K$.

The Newton polygon for 3x^{2} y^{3} − xy^{2} + 2x^{2}y^{2} − x^{3}y with positive monomials in red and negative monomials in cyan. Faces are labelled with their limiting terms.

Other applications of the Newton polygon comes from the fact that a Newton Polygon is sometimes a special case of a Newton polytope, and can be used to construct asymptotic solutions of two-variable polynomial equations like $3 x^2 y^3 - x y^2 + 2 x^2 y^2 - x^3 y = 0.$

== Symmetric function explanation ==
In the context of a valuation, we are given certain information in the form of the valuations of elementary symmetric functions of the roots of a polynomial, and require information on the valuations of the actual roots, in an algebraic closure. This has aspects both of ramification theory and singularity theory. The valid inferences possible are to the valuations of power sums, by means of Newton's identities.

== History ==
Newton polygons are named after Isaac Newton, who first described them and some of their uses in correspondence from the year 1676 addressed to Henry Oldenburg.

== See also ==
- F-crystal
- Eisenstein's criterion
- Newton–Okounkov body
- Newton polytope
