= Bhargav Bhatt (mathematician) =

Indian-American mathematician (born 1983)

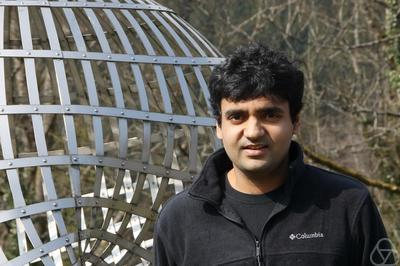
- Bhatt at the Algebraic Geometry Workshop, Oberwolfach 2015
- Born: 1983 (age 42–43)
- Education: Columbia University (B.S.); Princeton University (Ph.D.)
- Awards: Packard Fellow (2015); New Horizons in Mathematics Prize (2021); American Mathematical Society Fellow (2021) Clay Research Award (2021) Nemmers Prize in Mathematics (2022) Infosys Prize in Mathematical Sciences (2023)
- Scientific career
- Fields: Mathematics
- Workplaces: University of Michigan; Institute for Advanced Study
- Thesis: Derived Direct Summands (2010)
- Doctoral advisor: Aise Johan de Jong
- Other academic advisors: Shou-Wu Zhang

Bhargav Bhatt (born 1983) is an Indian-American mathematician who is the Fernholz Joint Professor at the Institute for Advanced Study and Princeton University and works in arithmetic geometry and commutative algebra.

== Early life and education ==
Bhatt graduated with a B.S. in Applied Mathematics, summa cum laude from Columbia University under the supervision of Shou-Wu Zhang. He received his Ph.D. from Princeton University in 2010 under the supervision of Aise Johan de Jong.

== Career ==
Bhatt was a Postdoctoral Assistant Professor in mathematics at the University of Michigan from 2010 to 2014 (on leave from 2012 to 2014). Bhatt was a member of the Institute for Advanced Study from 2012 to 2014. He then returned to the University of Michigan, serving as an associate professor from 2014 to 2015, a Gehring Associate Professor from 2015 to 2018, a Professor from 2018 to 2020, and a Frederick W and Lois B Gehring Professor since 2020. In July 2022, he was appointed as the Fernholz Joint Professor in the School of Mathematics at the Institute for Advanced Study, with a joint appointment at Princeton University.

Bhatt is currently (July 2025) on the editorial board of the journal Annals of Mathematics.

== Research ==
Bhatt's research focuses on commutative algebra and arithmetic geometry, especially on p-adic cohomology. Bhatt and Peter Scholze have developed a theory of prismatic cohomology, which has been described as progress towards motivic cohomology by unifying singular cohomology, de Rham cohomology, ℓ-adic cohomology, and crystalline cohomology.

== Awards ==
In 2015, Bhatt was awarded a 5-year Packard Fellowship. Bhatt received the 2021 New Horizons in Mathematics Prize. He was elected to become a Fellow of the American Mathematical Society in 2021. Also in 2021 he received the Clay Research Award. In 2022 he was awarded the Nemmers Prize in Mathematics. Bhatt won the Infosys Prize 2023 in Mathematical Sciences for his outstanding contributions to arithmetic geometry and commutative algebra. Bhatt's fundamental work on prismatic cohomology (joint with Peter Scholze), his work around the direct summand conjecture in commutative algebra, introduces new ideas and powerful methods in an area at the heart of pure mathematics.

== Selected publications ==
- Bhatt, Bhargav (2012). "Derived splinters in positive characteristic". Compositio Mathematica. 148 (6): 1757–1786. arXiv:1109.0354. doi:10.1112/S0010437X12000309. ISSN 0010-437X. S2CID 119152994.
- Bhatt, Bhargav (2012). "Annihilating the cohomology of group schemes". Algebra & Number Theory. 6 (7): 1561–1577. arXiv:1109.2383. doi:10.2140/ant.2012.6.1561. ISSN 1944-7833. S2CID 55015992.
- Bhatt, Bhargav; Blickle, Manuel; Lyubeznik, Gennady; Singh, Anurag K.; Zhang, Wenliang (2014). "Local cohomology modules of a smooth $\mathbb{Z}$ -algebra have finitely many associated primes". Inventiones Mathematicae. 197 (3): 509–519. arXiv:1304.4692. doi:10.1007/s00222-013-0490-z. ISSN 0020-9910. S2CID 119143902.
- Bhatt, Bhargav; Scholze, Peter (2017). "Projectivity of the Witt vector affine Grassmannian". Inventiones Mathematicae. 209 (2): 329–423. arXiv:1507.06490. Bibcode:2017InMat.209..329B. doi:10.1007/s00222-016-0710-4. ISSN 0020-9910. S2CID 119123398.
- Bhatt, Bhargav (2018). "On the direct summand conjecture and its derived variant". Inventiones Mathematicae. 212 (2): 297–317. arXiv:1608.08882. Bibcode:2018InMat.212..297B. doi:10.1007/s00222-017-0768-7. ISSN 0020-9910. S2CID 119176516.
- Bhatt, Bhargav; Caraiani, Ana; Kedlaya, Kiran; Scholze, Peter; Weinstein, Jared (2019). Cais, Bryden (ed.). Perfectoid Spaces. Mathematical Surveys and Monographs. Vol. 242. Providence, Rhode Island: American Mathematical Society. doi:10.1090/surv/242. ISBN 978-1-4704-5015-1. OCLC 1124911652.
