= BKK (disambiguation) =

BKK is the IATA airport code for Suvarnabhumi Airport, Thailand.

It can also refer to:

- The city of Bangkok, Thailand
  - The previous airport code of Don Mueang International Airport, Thailand (now DMK)
  - Bangkok Metropolitan Region
- The Backus-Kehoe-Kydland puzzle, a puzzle in economics
- Bergenshalvøens Kommunale Kraftselskap, a Norwegian power company
- The Bernstein–Khovanskii–Kushnirenko theorem, in algebraic geometry
- Betriebskrankenkasse (de), a type of insurance for healthcare in Austria and healthcare in Germany
- The British Karate Kyokushinkai
- Budapesti Közlekedési Központ ("Centre for Budapest Transport"), the unified transport operator of Budapest, Hungary
- Bukkake
