= Peter Scholze =

German mathematician (born 1987)

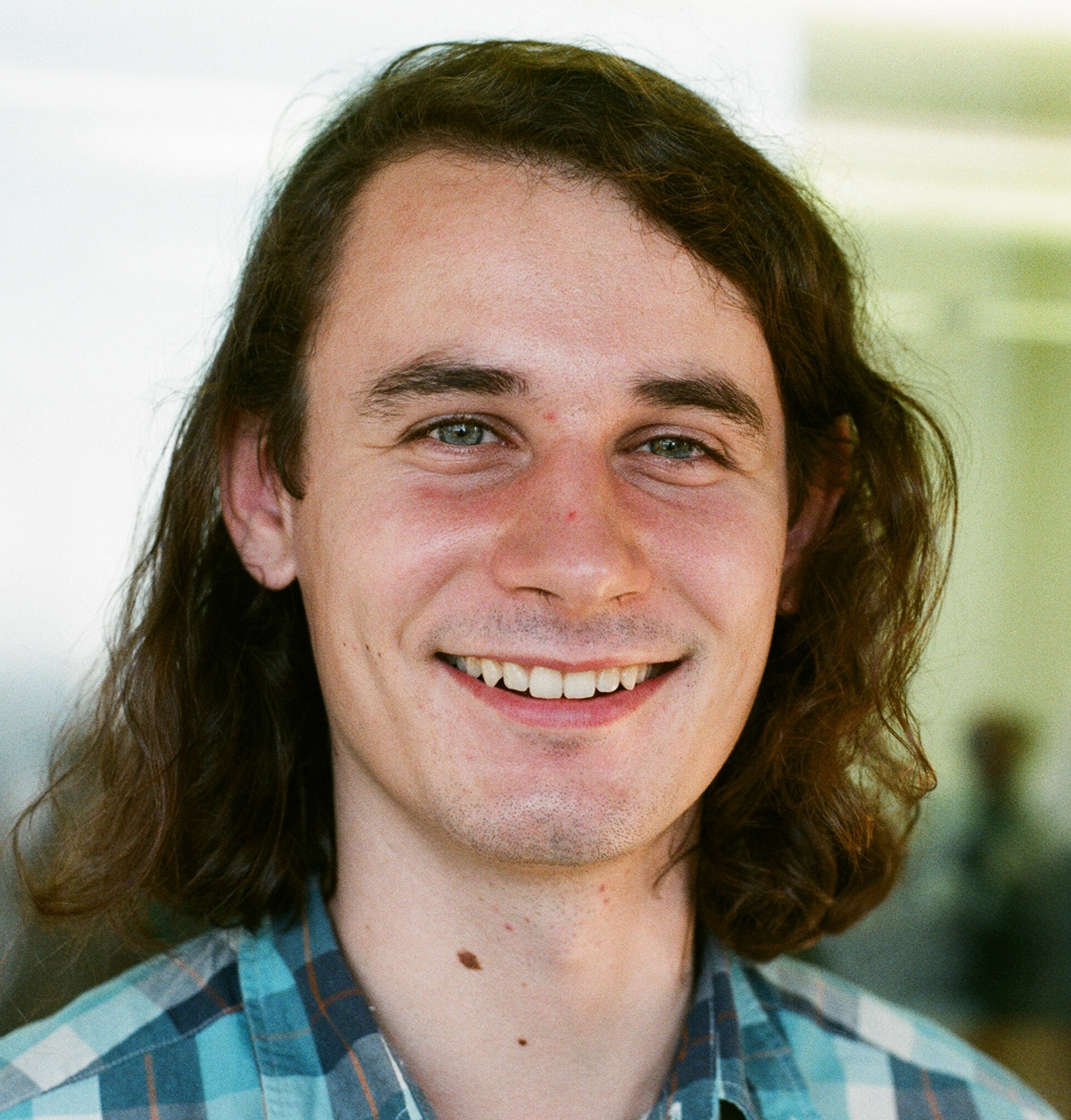
- Scholze in Berkeley, 2014
- Born: 11 December 1987 (age 38); Dresden, East Germany
- Education: University of Bonn
- Known for: Perfectoid spaces; Diamonds; Prismatic cohomology; Condensed mathematics; Geometrization of the local Langlands conjectures; Analytic stacks; Habiro cohomology; Berkovich motives; Gestalten
- Children: 1
- Awards: Prix and Cours Peccot (2012); SASTRA Ramanujan Prize (2013); Clay Research Award (2014); Cole Prize (2015); Fermat Prize (2015); Ostrowski Prize (2015); EMS Prize (2016); Leibniz Prize (2016); Berlin-Brandenburg Academy Award (2016); Fields Medal (2018)
- Scientific career
- Fields: Mathematics; Arithmetic geometry; Algebraic geometry; Algebraic number theory
- Workplaces: University of Bonn; Max Planck Institute for Mathematics; Academy of Sciences Leopoldina; University of California, Berkeley; Clay Mathematics Institute
- Thesis: Perfectoid Spaces (2011)
- Doctoral advisor: Michael Rapoport

Peter Scholze (German pronunciation: [ˈpeːtɐ ˈʃɔltsə]; born 11 December 1987) is a German mathematician known for his work in arithmetic geometry. He has been a professor in the University of Bonn since 2012 and co-director at the Max Planck Institute for Mathematics since 2018. He has been called one of the leading mathematicians in the world. In 2018, he won the Fields Medal, an award regarded as the highest professional honor in mathematics.

== Early life and education ==
Scholze was born in Dresden and grew up in Berlin. His father is a physicist, his mother a computer scientist, and his sister studied chemistry. He attended the Heinrich-Hertz-Gymnasium in Berlin-Friedrichshain, a gymnasium devoted to mathematics and science. As a student, Scholze participated in the International Mathematical Olympiad, winning three gold medals and one silver medal.

He studied at the University of Bonn and completed his bachelor's degree in three semesters and his master's degree in two further semesters. He obtained his Ph.D. in 2012 under the supervision of Michael Rapoport.

Scholze was a student of Rapoport, who was a student of Deligne, who was a student of Grothendieck, who was a student of Schwartz; in this chain, Scholze, Deligne, Grothendieck, and Schwartz are all Fields medallists.

== Career ==
From July 2011 until 2016, Scholze was a research fellow of the Clay Mathematics Institute in New Hampshire. In 2012, shortly after completing his PhD, he was made full professor in the University of Bonn, becoming at the age of 24 the youngest full professor in Germany.

In fall 2014, Scholze was appointed a chancellor's professor in the University of California, Berkeley, where he taught a course on p-adic geometry.

In 2018, Scholze was appointed as a director of the Max Planck Institute for Mathematics in Bonn.

Scholze is a member of the AI-free caucus of the Association for Human Mathematics. Members of the AI-free caucus do not use AI models in a research capacity.

== Work ==
Peter Scholze's work focuses on local aspects of p-adic algebraic geometry. He presented in a more compact form some of the previous fundamental theories pioneered by Gerd Faltings, Jean-Marc Fontaine and later by Kiran Kedlaya. His PhD thesis on perfectoid spaces yields the solution to a special case of the weight-monodromy conjecture.

Scholze and Bhargav Bhatt have developed a theory of prismatic cohomology, which has been described as progress towards motivic cohomology by unifying singular cohomology, de Rham cohomology, ℓ-adic cohomology, and crystalline cohomology.

Scholze and Dustin Clausen proposed a program for condensed mathematics.

== Awards ==
In 2012, he was awarded the Prix and Cours Peccot. He was awarded the 2013 SASTRA Ramanujan Prize. In 2014, he received the Clay Research Award. In 2015, he was awarded the Cole Prize in Algebra, and the Ostrowski Prize.

He received the Fermat Prize 2015 from the Institut de Mathématiques de Toulouse. In 2016, he was awarded the Leibniz Prize 2016 by the German Research Foundation. He declined the $100,000 "New Horizons in Mathematics Prize" of the 2016 Breakthrough Prizes. His turning down of the prize received some media attention.

In 2017 he became a member of the German Academy of Sciences Leopoldina.

In 2018, at thirty years old, Scholze, who was at the time serving as a mathematics professor in the University of Bonn, became one of the youngest mathematicians ever to be awarded the Fields Medal for "transforming arithmetic algebraic geometry over p-adic fields through his introduction of perfectoid spaces, with application to Galois representations, and for the development of new cohomology theories."

In 2019, Scholze received the Commander's Cross of the Order of Merit of the Federal Republic of Germany.

In 2022 he became a foreign member of the Royal Society and was awarded the Pius XI Medal from the Pontifical Academy of Sciences.

== Personal life ==
Scholze is married to a fellow mathematician and has a daughter.
