= Special trinomial =

In algebra, specifically in the factorization of polynomials, a special trinomial is a polynomial that can be expressed in the form:

$$ax^2+bx+c \qquad (\mbox{with } a,b,c \ne 0)$$

and for which there is a known method for factoring it as the product of two first-degree binomials.

== Factoring Method ==
We can distinguish between the cases in which the coefficient of the quadratic term is equal to or different from $1$.

=== a = 1 ===
If the coefficient of the quadratic term is equal to $1$, the trinomial takes the form:

$$x^2+bx+c \,$$

in this case, it can be factored into the product of two first-degree binomials, in the form:

$$(x+u)(x+v)$$,

where $u$ and $v$ are two terms with the following two properties:

- $u+v=b$
- $u\cdot v=c$.

In fact, performing the calculations yields:

$$\begin{align}
(x+u)(x+v)&=x^2+vx+ux+uv\\
&=x^2+x(v+u)+uv\\
&=x^2+bx+c\\
\end{align}$$

A practical method to find $u$ and $v$ is to solve for the two roots of the polynomial. In fact, if

$$x^2+bx+c=0$$,

then:

$$(x-u)(x-v)=0 \Rightarrow \begin{cases}
x_1=u\\
x_2=v
\end{cases}$$

To find the roots of the quadratic trinomial, simply use the quadratic formula:

$$x_{1,2}=\frac{-b \pm \sqrt{b^2-4ac}}{2a}$$

=== a ≠ 1 ===
If the coefficient of the quadratic term is not $1$, the trinomial can be factored as follows:

$$ax^2+bx+c=a(x+u)(x+v)$$,

where $u$ and $v$ have the following properties:

- $u+v=\frac{b}{a}$
- $u\cdot v=\frac{c}{a}$.

In this case as well, the factorization can be demonstrated as follows:

$$\begin{align}
a(x+u)(x+v)&=ax^2+avx+aux+auv \\
&=ax^2+ax(v+u)+auv \\
&=ax^2+bx+c \\
\end{align}$$

As in the previous case, $u$ and $v$ can be found by solving for the roots of the polynomial using the quadratic formula.

== Trinomials of degree greater than 2 ==
=== Factoring by substitution ===
More generally, if we consider the trinomial:

$$ax^{2n}+bx^n+c$$

This can be factored by making the substitution $x^n=t$, which gives the trinomial:

$$at^2+bt+c$$,

that can be factored using the methods described above and then by reapplying the substitution in reverse.

=== Direct factoring ===
Considering the previous properties:

- $u+v=\frac{b}{a}$
- $u\cdot v=\frac{c}{a}$.

The trinomial can also be directly factored as follows:

$$ax^{2n}+bx^n+c=a(x^n+u)(x^n+v)$$

The factorization can be demonstrated as follows:

$$\begin{align}
a(x^n+u)(x^n+v)&=ax^{2n}+ax^nu+ax^nv+auv\\
&=ax^{2n}+ax^n(u+v)+auv\\
&=ax^{2n}+ax^n\frac ba+a\frac ca\\
&=ax^{2n}+bx^n+c
\end{align}$$

Also in this case $u$ and $v$ can be found by solving for the roots of the polynomial using the quadratic formula.

== Bibliography ==
- Marzia Re Fraschini, Gabriella Grazzi (2012). I principi della matematica (Volume 3). Atlas. ISBN 978-88-268-1711-8.
- Massimo Bergamini, Graziella Barozzi, Anna Trifone. Matematica.blu (seconda edizione) Vol.1. Zanichelli - Bologna, 2018. ISBN 978-88-08-22085-1.
