= Rigid cohomology =

In mathematics, specifically in algebraic geometry, rigid cohomology is a p-adic cohomology theory introduced by Pierre Berthelot in 1986. It extends crystalline cohomology to schemes that need not be proper or smooth, and extends Monsky–Washnitzer cohomology to non-affine varieties.

For a scheme $X$ of finite type over a perfect field $k$, there are rigid cohomology groups $H^i_{\textrm{rig}}(X/K)$ which are finite dimensional vector spaces over the field $K$ of fractions of the ring of Witt vectors of $k$. More generally, one can define rigid cohomology with compact supports, or with support on a closed subscheme, or with coefficients in an overconvergent isocrystal. If $X$ is smooth and proper over $k$, the rigid cohomology groups are the same as the crystalline cohomology groups.

The name "rigid cohomology" comes from its relation to rigid analytic spaces.

In 2006, Kiran Kedlaya used rigid cohomology to give a new proof of the Weil conjectures.
