= Trinomial =

Polynomial that has three terms

Layers of Pascal's pyramid derived from coefficients in an upside-down ternary plot of the terms in the expansions of the powers of a trinomial

In elementary algebra, a trinomial is a polynomial consisting of three terms or monomials.

== Examples of trinomial expressions ==
1. $3x + 5y + 8z$ with $x, y, z$ variables
2. $3t + 9s^2 + 3y^3$ with $t, s, y$ variables
3. $3ts + 9t + 5s$ with $t, s$ variables
4. $ax^2+bx+c$, the quadratic polynomial in standard form with $a,b,c$ variables. (Note: Quadratic expressions are not always trinomials, the expressions' appearance can vary.)
5. $A x^a y^b z^c + B t + C s$ with $x, y, z, t, s$ variables, $a, b, c$ nonnegative integers and $A, B, C$ any constants.
6. $Px^a + Qx^b + Rx^c$ where $x$ is variable and constants $a, b, c$ are nonnegative integers and $P, Q, R$ any constants.

== Trinomial equation ==
A trinomial equation is a polynomial equation involving three terms. An example is the equation $x = q + x^m$ studied by Johann Heinrich Lambert in the 18th century.

=== Some notable trinomials ===
- The quadratic trinomial in standard form (as from above):

$$ax^2+bx+c$$

- sum or difference of two cubes:

$$a^3 \pm b^3 = (a \pm b)(a^2 \mp ab + b^2)$$

- A special type of trinomial can be factored in a manner similar to quadratics since it can be viewed as a quadratic in a new variable (x^{n} below). This form is factored as:

$$x^{2n} + rx^n + s = (x^n + a_1)(x^n + a_2),$$

where

$$\begin{align}
a_1+a_2 &= r\\
a_1 \cdot a_2 &= s.
\end{align}$$

For instance, the polynomial x^{2} + 3x + 2 is an example of this type of trinomial with n = 1. The solution a_{1} = −2 and a_{2} = −1 of the above system gives the trinomial factorization:

x^{2} + 3x + 2 = (x + a_{1})(x + a_{2}) = (x + 2)(x + 1).

The same result can be provided by Ruffini's rule, but with a more complex and time-consuming process.

== See also ==
- Binomial
- Compound expression
- Monomial
- Multinomial
- Pascal's_pyramid
- Simple expression
- Sparse polynomial
- Trinomial expansion
