= William Fulton (mathematician) =

American mathematician (born 1939)

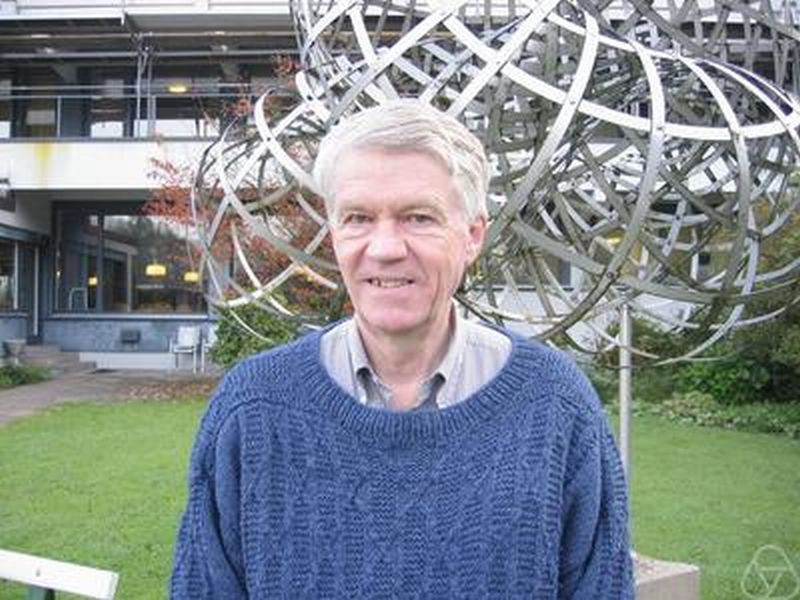
- William Fulton at Oberwolfach in 2006
- Born: August 29, 1939 (age 87); Naugatuck, Connecticut, United States
- Education: Princeton (Ph.D.); Brown University
- Awards: Leroy P. Steele Prize (2010); Member of the National Academy of Sciences (1997)
- Scientific career
- Fields: Mathematics
- Workplaces: University of Michigan; University of Chicago; Brown University; Brandeis University
- Thesis: The Fundamental Group of an Algebraic Curve (1966)
- Doctoral advisor: Gerard Washnitzer
- Other academic advisors: John Milnor; John Coleman Moore; Goro Shimura
- Doctoral students: Paolo Aluffi; Thomas A. Garrity; Andrew Kresch; Robert Lazarsfeld

William Edgar Fulton (born August 29, 1939) is an American mathematician, specializing in algebraic geometry.

== Education and career ==
He received his undergraduate degree from Brown University in 1961 and his doctorate from Princeton University in 1966. His Ph.D. thesis, written under the supervision of Gerard Washnitzer, was on The fundamental group of an algebraic curve.

Fulton worked at Princeton and Brandeis University from 1965 until 1970, when he began teaching at Brown. In 1987, he moved to the University of Chicago. He moved to the University of Michigan in 1998, retiring in 2020. As of 2026, Fulton had supervised the doctoral work of 24 students at Brown, Chicago, and Michigan.

Fulton is known as the author or coauthor of a number of popular texts, including Algebraic Curves and Representation Theory.

== Awards and honors ==
In 1996, he received the Steele Prize for mathematical exposition for his text Intersection Theory. Fulton is a member of the United States National Academy of Sciences since 1997; a fellow of the American Academy of Arts and Sciences from 1998, and was elected a foreign member of the Royal Swedish Academy of Sciences in 2000. In 2010, he was awarded the Steele Prize for Lifetime Achievement. In 2012, he became a fellow of the American Mathematical Society.

== Selected works ==
- Fulton, William (2008). Algebraic curves: an introduction to algebraic geometry (PDF) (3rd ed.). 1st edn. 1969.
- William Fulton (1998), Intersection theory, Ergebnisse der Mathematik und ihrer Grenzgebiete. 3. Folge. A Series of Modern Surveys in Mathematics [Results in Mathematics and Related Areas. 3rd Series. A Series of Modern Surveys in Mathematics], vol. 2 (2nd ed.), Berlin, New York: Springer-Verlag, doi:10.1007/978-1-4612-1700-8, ISBN 978-3-540-62046-4, MR 1644323 1st edn. 1984.
- Fulton, William; Harris, Joe (1991). Representation Theory, A First Course. Graduate Texts in Mathematics. Vol. 129. Berlin, New York: Springer-Verlag. ISBN 978-0-387-97495-8. MR 1153249.

== See also ==
- Fulton–Hansen connectedness theorem
