= Andrew Kresch =

American mathematician and professor

Andrew Harold Kresch (born 1972) is an American mathematician specializing in algebraic geometry and a professor at the University of Zurich.

Kresch won a silver medal at the 1989 International Mathematical Olympiad. He studied at the Yale University and received his PhD from University of Chicago in 1998 under the supervision of William Fulton on Chow Homology for Artin Stacks. He was lecturer at the University of Warwick and became a full professor at the University of Zurich in 2006.

In 2024 Kresch became an elected member of Academia Europaea.

== Publications (Selection) ==
- with Buch, Anders Skovsted; Tamvakis, Harry (2017). A Giambelli formula for isotropic Grassmannians. Selecta Mathematica, 23(2):869-914.
- with Buch, Anders Skovsted; Purbhoo, Kevin; Tamvakis, Harry (2016). The puzzle conjecture for the cohomology of two-step flag manifolds. Journal of Algebraic Combinatorics, 44(4):973-1007.
- with Bumsig, Kim; Oh Yong-Geun. A compactification of the space of maps from curves. Transactions of the American Mathematical Society, vol. 366, no. 1, 2014, pp. 51–74. JSTOR, https://www.jstor.org/stable/23813129. Accessed 30 Aug. 2022.
- Flattening stratification and the stack of partial stabilizations of prestable curves. (2013) Bulletin of the London Mathematical Society, 45(1):93-102.
- On the geometry of Deligne-Mumford stacks. In: Abramovich, D; Bertram, A; Katzarkov, L; Pandharipande, R; Thaddeus, M. Algebraic Geometry: Seattle 2005. Providence, Rhode Island: American Mathematical Society, 259–271.
- with Tamvakis, H (2003). Quantum cohomology of the Lagrangian Grassmannian. Journal of Algebraic Geometry, 12(4):777-810.
- with Edidin, D; Hassett, B; Vistoli, A (2001). Brauer groups and quotient stacks. American Journal of Mathematics, 123(4):761-777.
- Gromov-Witten invariants of a class of toric varieties (2000). Michigan Mathematical Journal, 48(1):369-391.
