= Newton–Okounkov body =

In algebraic geometry, a Newton–Okounkov body, also called an Okounkov body, is a convex body in Euclidean space associated to a divisor (or more generally a linear system) on a variety. The convex geometry of a Newton–Okounkov body encodes (asymptotic) information about the geometry of the variety and the divisor. It is a large generalization of the notion of the Newton polytope of a projective toric variety.

It was introduced (in passing) by Andrei Okounkov in his papers in the late 1990s and early 2000s. Okounkov's construction relies on an earlier result of Askold Khovanskii on semigroups of lattice points. Later, Okounkov's construction was generalized and systematically developed in the papers of Robert Lazarsfeld and Mircea Mustață as well as Kiumars Kaveh and Khovanskii.

Beside Newton polytopes of toric varieties, several polytopes appearing in representation theory (such as the Gelfand–Zetlin polytopes and the string polytopes of Peter Littelmann and Arkady Berenstein–Andrei Zelevinsky) can be realized as special cases of Newton–Okounkov bodies.
