= Gerard Washnitzer =

American mathematician

Gerard Washnitzer

Gerard Washnitzer (1926 in New York City – April 2, 2017) was an American mathematician specializing in algebraic geometry.

Washnitzer studied at Princeton University under Emil Artin and in 1950 received a Ph.D. (A Dirichlet Principle for analytic functions of several complex variables) under the supervision of Salomon Bochner. In 1952 he was a C. L. E. Moore instructor at the Massachusetts Institute of Technology. After that, he was an associate professor at Johns Hopkins University and then a professor at Princeton University. From 1960 to 1961 and from 1967 to 1968 he was at the Institute for Advanced Study.

In 1968, together with Paul Monsky, he introduced the Monsky–Washnitzer cohomology, which is a p-adic cohomology theory for non-singular algebraic varieties.

Among his students was William Fulton.
