= Thomas A. Garrity =

American mathematician

- Born: April 25, 1959 (age 66)

Academic background
- Education: University of Texas at Austin; Brown University
- Thesis: On Ample Vector Bundles and Negative Curvature (1986)
- Doctoral advisor: William Fulton

Thomas Anthony Garrity (born 25 April 1959) is an American mathematician. He teaches at Williams College, where he is the Webster Atwell Class of 1921 Professor of Mathematics.

== Early life and education ==
Thomas Anthony Garrity was born in 1959. He completed his bachelor's degree in mathematics at the University of Texas at Austin in 1981. He attended Brown University for doctoral studies, completing a PhD in mathematics in 1986 under the supervision of professor William Fulton. Garrity's doctoral thesis was titled On Ample Vector Bundles and Negative Curvature.

== Career ==
Garrity is currently a professor of mathematics at Williams College, where he has taught since 1989.

=== Research ===
In 1989, Garrity and three other collaborators found an algorithm in NC to factorize rational polynomials over the complex numbers.

In 1991, Garrity discovered the concept of "geometric continuity", which generalizes several other notions of continuity for both explicit and implicit surfaces.

In 1999, Garrity came up with the concept of a simplex sequence, which is an alternate approach to the Hermite problem (of which the Jacobi-Perron algorithm is yet another approach). For the case of ordered pairs, if the simplex sequence is eventually periodic, then the two numbers must be of degree at most three.

== Recognition ==
Garrity was a 2004 recipient of one of the Deborah and Franklin Haimo Awards for Distinguished College or University Teaching of Mathematics.

== Bibliography ==
His books include:

- Garrity, Thomas A. (2015). Electricity and Magnetism for Mathematicians: A Guided Path from Maxwell's Equations to Yang-Mills. Cambridge University Press. ISBN 9781107078208.
- Garrity, Thomas A. (2013). Algebraic Geometry: A Problem-Solving Approach. American Mathematical Society. ISBN 9780821893968.
- Garrity, Thomas A. (2004). All the Mathematics You Missed. Cambridge University Press. ISBN 9787302090854.
- Adams, Colin; Garrity, Thomas A. (2009). The United States of Mathematics Presidential Debate (DVD). ISBN 978-0-88385-910-0.
