= Divided power structure =

Mathematical object

In mathematics, specifically commutative algebra, a divided power structure is a way of introducing items with similar properties as expressions of the form $x^n / n!$ have, also when it is not possible to actually divide by $n!$. Just like there are polynomial algebras on n generators, there the foundational object in this setting is the divided power algebra on n generators.

== Definition of a free divided power algebra on n generators ==
Let $R$ be a ring. The free divided power algebra on one generator over $R$ is $R\langle x\rangle$ and it is supposed to be defined as $R\bigl[\tfrac{x^i}{i!}\bigr]_i$. Lets find a way of defining this without using division because division may not make sense in the ring $R$. Define $\tfrac{x^i}{i!}:=\gamma_i$. Then

$\gamma_i\gamma_j =\frac{\gamma_1^{i+j}}{i!j!} =\frac{(i+j)!}{i!j!}\gamma_{i+j} =\binom{i+j}{i}\gamma_{i+j}.$

This means we can properly define $R\bigl[\tfrac{x^i}{i!}\bigr]_i$ to be

$R[\gamma_i]/\left(\gamma_i\gamma_j=\binom{i+j}{i}\gamma_{i+j}\right).$

Thus this will be our definition of the divided power algebra $R\langle x\rangle$. We define $R\langle x_1,\ldots,x_n\rangle$ to be $\otimes_i R\langle x_i\rangle$ and we call this the free divided power algebra on $n$ generators over $R$.

== Definition of a divided power structure ==
The preceding section has the following generalization. Let A be a commutative ring with an ideal I. A divided power structure (or PD-structure, after the French puissances divisées) on I is a collection of maps $\gamma_n : I \to A$ for n = 0, 1, 2, ... such that:

1. $\gamma_0(x) = 1$ and $\gamma_1(x) = x$ for $x \in I$, while $\gamma_n(x) \in I$ for n > 0.
2. $\gamma_n(x + y) = \sum_{i=0}^n \gamma_{n-i}(x) \gamma_i(y)$ for $x, y \in I$.
3. $\gamma_n(\lambda x) = \lambda^n \gamma_n(x)$ for $\lambda \in A, x \in I$.
4. $\gamma_m(x) \gamma_n(x) = ((m, n)) \gamma_{m+n}(x)$ for $x \in I$, where $((m, n)) = \frac{(m+n)!}{m! n!}$ is an integer.
5. $\gamma_n(\gamma_m(x)) = C_{n, m} \gamma_{mn}(x)$ for $x \in I$ and $m > 0$, where $C_{n, m} = \frac{(mn)!}{(m!)^n n!}$ is an integer.

For convenience of notation, $\gamma_n(x)$ is often written as $x^{[n]}$ when it is clear what divided power structure is meant.

The term divided power ideal refers to an ideal with a given divided power structure, and divided power ring refers to a ring with a given ideal with divided power structure.

Homomorphisms of divided power algebras are ring homomorphisms that respect the divided power structure on its source and target.

== Examples ==
- The free divided power algebra over $\Z$ on one generator:

$$\Z\langle x\rangle := \Z\left[x,\tfrac{x^2}{2},\ldots,\tfrac{x^n}{n!},\ldots\right]\subset \Q[x].$$

One may see this as a divided power structure also by letting $A=\Z[x]$, $I$ the ideal generated by $x$, and the map $\gamma_i$ be defined by $\gamma_i(x)=\tfrac{x}{i!}$.

- If A is an algebra over $\Q$, then every ideal I has a unique divided power structure where $\gamma_n(x)=\tfrac{1}{n!}\cdot x^n.$ Indeed, this is the example which motivates the definition in the first place.
- If M is an A-module, let $S^\bullet M$ denote the symmetric algebra of M over A. Then its dual $(S^\bullet M)^\vee=\operatorname{Hom}_A(S^\bullet M, A)$ has a canonical structure of divided power ring. In fact, it is canonically isomorphic to a natural completion of $\Gamma_A(\check{M})$ (see below) if M has finite rank.

== Constructions ==
If A is any ring then we have the free divided power algebra on n generators

$$A \langle x_1, x_2, \ldots, x_n \rangle$$

defined in the first section above. Concretely it consists of so called divided power polynomials in the variables

$$x_1, x_2, \ldots, x_n,$$,

that is sums of divided power monomials of the form

$$c x_1^{[i_1]} x_2^{[i_2]} \cdots x_n^{[i_n]}$$

with $c \in A$. The structure of a divided power algebra(of the third section) is given by letting I be the ideal of divided power polynomials with no constant coefficient.

More generally, if M is an A-module, there is a free divided A-algebra on M, called

$$\Gamma_A(M),$$

with PD ideal

$$\Gamma_+(M)$$

and an A-linear map

$$M \to \Gamma_+(M).$$

(The case of divided power polynomials is the special case in which M is a free module over A of finite rank.)

If I is any ideal of a ring A, there is a universal construction which extends A with divided powers of elements of I to get a divided power envelope of I in A.

== Applications ==
The concrete divided power algebras of the first two sections are ubiquitous in algebraic topology since a free divided power algebra on n generators is just the dual of a polynomial algebra. The divided power envelope is a fundamental tool in the theory of PD differential operators and crystalline cohomology, where it is used to overcome technical difficulties which arise in positive characteristic.

The divided power functor is used in the construction of co-Schur functors.

== See also ==
- Crystalline cohomology
