= Supersingular prime (algebraic number theory) =

Prime number with a certain relationship to an elliptic curve

In algebraic number theory, a supersingular prime for a given elliptic curve is a prime number with a certain relationship to that curve. If the curve $E$ is defined over the rational numbers, then a prime $p$ is supersingular for E if the reduction of $E$ modulo $p$ is a supersingular elliptic curve over the residue field $\mathbb{F}_p$.

Equivalently, for a prime $p > 3$ of good reduction for $E$, the prime is supersingular for $E$ if and only if the trace of the Frobenius endomorphism $a_p = p + 1 - \#E(\mathbb{F}_p)$ is zero, that is, $\#E(\mathbb{F}_p) = p + 1$. This condition means that the reduction of $E$ modulo $p$ has the maximum possible endomorphism ring—an order in a quaternion algebra—rather than an order in an imaginary quadratic field.

== Distribution ==
=== Complex multiplication case ===
When $E$ has complex multiplication (CM) by an order in an imaginary quadratic field $K$, the distribution of supersingular primes is well understood. A classical result of Deuring (1941) implies that a prime $p$ of good reduction is supersingular for $E$ if and only if $p$ is inert or ramified in $K$. By the Chebotarev density theorem, these primes constitute exactly half of all primes, so the set of supersingular primes for a CM curve has natural density $1/2$.

=== Non-CM case ===
When $E$ does not have complex multiplication, the situation is more subtle. In 1968, Serre proved that the set of supersingular primes has asymptotic density zero by applying the Chebotarev density theorem to the number fields generated by coordinates of the torsion points of $E$. Serre later obtained the unconditional upper bound

$$\pi_{E,0}(x) \ll \frac{x}{\left(\log x\right)^{3/2 - \varepsilon}}$$

for any $\varepsilon > 0$, where $\pi_{E,0}(x)$ denotes the number of supersingular primes up to $x$, and showed that under the Generalized Riemann Hypothesis (GRH) one could achieve the bound $\pi_{E,0}(x) \ll x^{3/4}$. The unconditional exponent was subsequently improved by Wan (1990), who showed

$$\pi_{E,0}(x) \ll \frac{x}{\left(\log x\right)^{2 - \varepsilon}}$$

by incorporating sieve-theoretic techniques.

Despite this rarity, Noam Elkies proved in 1987 that every elliptic curve over $\mathbb{Q}$ has infinitely many supersingular primes. His proof uses the theory of complex multiplication and Deuring's lifting lemma: given any finite set $S$ of primes, one can find a negative fundamental discriminant $-D$ such that the Hilbert class polynomial $P_D(X)$ evaluated at the j-invariant $j(E)$ has a prime factor outside $S$, and this prime is necessarily supersingular for $E$. Elkies later extended this result to elliptic curves defined over any number field with at least one real embedding.

=== Lang–Trotter conjecture ===
Lang & Trotter (1976) conjectured that the number of supersingular primes less than a bound $X$ satisfies

$$\pi_{E,0}(X) \sim C_E \frac{\sqrt{X}}{\log X}$$

as $X \to \infty$, where $C_E > 0$ is an explicit constant depending on $E$. This prediction arises from a probabilistic heuristic: by the Hasse bound, $|a_p| \leq 2\sqrt{p}$, so the "probability" that $a_p = 0$ for a random prime $p$ is roughly $1/\sqrt{p}$, and summing this over primes up to $X$ gives an expected count on the order of $\sqrt{X}/\log X$. As of 2026, this conjecture remains open.

== Example ==
Consider the elliptic curve $E : y^2 + y = x^3 - x^2 - 10x - 20$, which is the modular curve $X_0(11)$ with j-invariant $j = -2^{12}/11$. The supersingular primes for this curve begin: 2, 19, 29, 199, 569, 809, 1289, 1439, 2539, 3319, ... (sequence A006962 in the OEIS). These are exactly the primes $p$ for which the coefficient of $q^p$ in $\eta(\tau)^2 \eta(11\tau)^2$ vanishes modulo $p$, where $\eta$ is the Dedekind eta function.

== Generalization ==
More generally, if $K$ is any global field—that is, a finite extension of $\mathbb{Q}$ or of $\mathbb{F}_p(t)$—and $A$ is an abelian variety defined over $K$, then a supersingular prime $\mathfrak{p}$ for A is a finite place of $K$ such that the reduction of $A$ modulo $\mathfrak{p}$ is a supersingular abelian variety. It is conjectured that every abelian variety over a number field has infinitely many supersingular primes, but this is known only in special cases.

== See also ==
- Supersingular prime (moonshine theory)
- Supersingular elliptic curve
- Lang–Trotter conjecture
- Sato–Tate conjecture
