= Multinomial =

Multinomial may refer to:

- Multinomial theorem, and the multinomial coefficient
- Multinomial distribution
- Multinomial logistic regression
- Multinomial test
- Multi-index notation
- Polynomial
