= Bernstein–Kushnirenko theorem =

On the number of common zeros of Laurent polynomials

The Bernstein–Kushnirenko theorem, also called Bernstein–Khovanskii–Kushnirenko theorem (BKK theorem), states that the number of nonzero complex solutions of a system of Laurent polynomial equations $f_1= \cdots = f_n=0$ is equal to the mixed volume of the Newton polytopes of such polynomials, assuming that all nonzero coefficients of $f_n$ are generic.

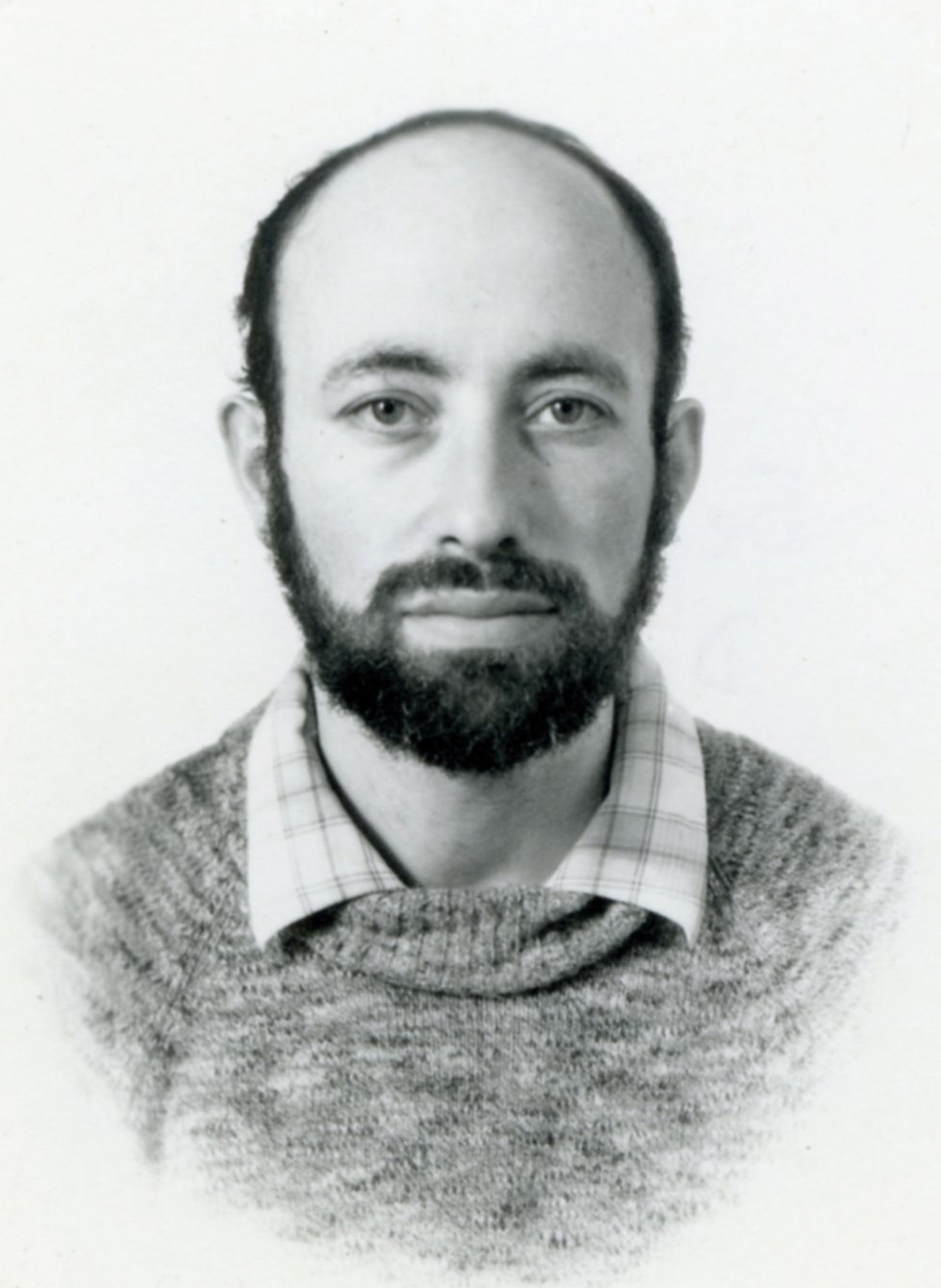
David N. Bernstein, circa 1975

It was proven by David Bernstein and Anatoliy Kushnirenko in 1975. Askold Khovanskii has found about 15 different proofs of this theorem.

== Statement ==
Let $A$ be a finite subset of $\Z^n.$ Consider the subspace $L_A$ of the Laurent polynomial algebra $\Complex \!\left[ x_1^{\pm 1}, \ldots, x_n^{\pm 1} \right]$ consisting of Laurent polynomials whose exponents are in $A$. That is:

$$L_A = \biggl\{ f \mathrel{\bigg|} f(x) = \sum_{\alpha \in A} c_\alpha x^\alpha, c_\alpha \in \Complex \biggr\},$$

where for each $\alpha = (a_1, \ldots, a_n) \in \Z^n$ we have used the shorthand notation $x^\alpha$ to denote the monomial $x_1^{a_1} \cdots x_n^{a_n}.$

Now take $n$ finite subsets $A_1, \ldots, A_n$ of $\Z^n$, with the corresponding subspaces of Laurent polynomials, $L_{A_1}, \ldots, L_{A_n}.$ Consider a generic system of equations from these subspaces, that is:

$$f_1(x) = \cdots = f_n(x) = 0,$$

where each $f_i$ is a generic element in the (finite-dimensional vector space) $L_{A_i}.$

The Bernstein–Kushnirenko theorem states that the number of solutions $x \in (\Complex \setminus 0)^n$ of such a system is equal to

$$n! V(\Delta_1, \ldots, \Delta_n),$$

where $V$ denotes the Minkowski mixed volume and for each $i, \Delta_i$ is the convex hull of the finite set of points $A_i$. Clearly, $\Delta_i$ is a convex lattice polytope; it can be interpreted as the Newton polytope of a generic element of the subspace $L_{A_i}$.

In particular, if all the sets $A_i$ are the same, $A = A_1 = \cdots = A_n,$ then the number of solutions of a generic system of Laurent polynomials from $L_A$ is equal to

$$n! \operatorname{vol} \Delta,$$

where $\Delta$ is the convex hull of $A$ and $\operatorname{vol}$ is the usual $n$-dimensional Euclidean volume. Note that even though the volume of a lattice polytope is not necessarily an integer, it becomes an integer after multiplying by $n!$.

== See also ==
- Bézout's theorem for another upper bound on the number of common zeros of n polynomials in n indeterminates.
