= Infinitesimal cohomology =

In mathematics, infinitesimal cohomology is a cohomology theory for algebraic varieties introduced by Grothendieck (1966). In characteristic 0 it is essentially the same as crystalline cohomology. In nonzero characteristic p Ogus (1975) showed that it is closely related to etale cohomology with mod p coefficients, a theory known to have undesirable properties.
