= Uwe Jannsen =

German mathematician (born 1954)

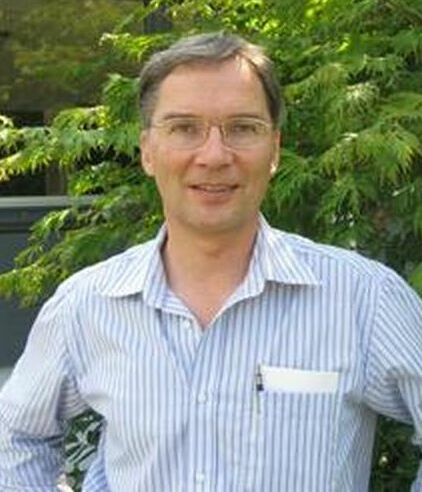
Jannsen at Oberwolfach, 2009

Uwe Jannsen (born 11 March 1954) is a German mathematician, specializing in algebra, algebraic number theory, and algebraic geometry.

== Education and career ==
Born in Meddewade, Jannsen studied mathematics and physics at the University of Hamburg with Diplom in mathematics in 1978 and with Promotion (PhD) in 1980 under Helmut Brückner and Jürgen Neukirch with thesis Über Galoisgruppen lokaler Körper (On Galois groups of local fields). In the academic year 1983–1984 he was a postdoc at Harvard University. From 1980 to 1989 he was an assistant and then docent at the University of Regensburg, where he received in 1988 his habilitation. From 1989 to 1991 he held a research professorship at the Max-Planck-Institut für Mathematik in Bonn. In 1991 he became a full professor at the University of Cologne and since 1999 he has been a professor at the University of Regensburg.

Jannsen's research deals with, among other topics, the Galois theory of algebraic number fields, the theory of motives in algebraic geometry, the Hasse principle (local–global principle), and resolution of singularities. In particular, he has done research on a cohomology theory for algebraic varieties, involving their extension in mixed motives as a development of research by Pierre Deligne, and a motivic cohomology as a development of research by Vladimir Voevodsky. In the 1980s with Kay Wingberg he completely described the absolute Galois group of p-adic number fields, i.e. in the local case.

In 1994 he was an Invited Speaker with talk Mixed motives, motivic cohomology and Ext-groups at the International Congress of Mathematicians in Zürich.

He was elected in 2009 a full member of the Bayerische Akademie der Wissenschaften and in 2011 a full member of the Academia Europaea.

His doctoral students include Moritz Kerz.

== Selected publications ==
- Continuous étale cohomology, Mathematische Annalen vol. 280, no. 2 1988, pp. 207–245 doi:10.1007/BF01456052
- "On the ℓ-adic cohomology of varieties over number fields and its Galois cohomology." In Galois Groups over $\mathbb{Q}$, pp. 315–360. Springer, New York, NY, 1989.
- Mixed motives and algebraic K-theory, Lecture Notes in Mathematics vol. 1400, Springer Verlag 1990 (with appendices by C. Schoen and Spencer Bloch).
- with Steven Kleiman and Jean-Pierre Serre (eds.): Motives, Proc. Symposium Pure Mathematics vol. 55, 2 vols., American Mathematical Society 1994 (Conference University of Washington, Seattle, 1991) vol. 2
- Motives, numerical equivalence and semi-simplicity, Inventiones Mathematicae, vol. 107 1992, pp. 447–452 doi:10.1007/BF01231898
