= Witt vector cohomology =

In mathematics, Witt vector cohomology was an early p-adic cohomology theory for algebraic varieties introduced by Serre (1958). Serre constructed it by defining a sheaf of truncated Witt rings W_{n} over a variety V and then taking the inverse limit of the sheaf cohomology groups H^{i}(V, W_{n}) of these sheaves. Serre observed that though it gives cohomology groups over a field of characteristic 0, it cannot be a Weil cohomology theory because the cohomology groups vanish when i > dim(V). For Abelian varieties, Serre (1958b) showed that one could obtain a reasonable first cohomology group by taking the direct sum of the Witt vector cohomology and the Tate module of the Picard variety.
