= Arthur Ogus =

American mathematician

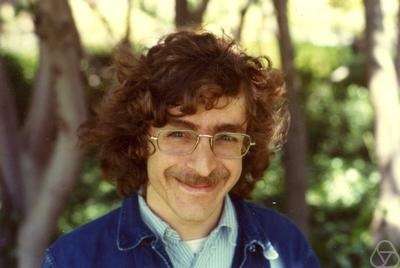
Arthur Ogus in 1975

Arthur Edward Ogus is an American mathematician. His research is in algebraic geometry; he has served as chair of the mathematics department at the University of California, Berkeley.

Ogus did his undergraduate studies at Reed College, graduating in 1968, and earned his doctorate in 1972 from Harvard University under the supervision of Robin Hartshorne. His doctoral students at Berkeley include Kai Behrend.

In September 2015, a conference in honor of his 70th birthday was held at the Institut des Hautes Études Scientifiques in France.

== Selected publications ==
Books

- Berthelot, Pierre; Ogus, Arthur (1978), Notes on crystalline cohomology, Princeton, N.J.: Princeton University Press, ISBN 0-691-08218-9, MR 0491705.
- Deligne, Pierre; Milne, James S.; Ogus, Arthur; Shih, Kuang-yen (1982), Hodge cycles, motives, and Shimura varieties, Lecture Notes in Mathematics, vol. 900, Berlin-New York: Springer-Verlag, ISBN 3-540-11174-3, MR 0654325.
- Ogus, Arthur (1994), "F-crystals, Griffiths transversality, and the Hodge decomposition", Astérisque, 221, MR 1280543.

Research papers

- Ogus, Arthur (1973), "Local cohomological dimension of algebraic varieties", Annals of Mathematics, Second Series, 98 (2): 327–365, doi:10.2307/1970785, JSTOR 1970785, MR 0506248.
- Bloch, Spencer; Ogus, Arthur (1974), "Gersten's conjecture and the homology of schemes", Annales Scientifiques de l'École Normale Supérieure, 7 (2): 181–201, doi:10.24033/asens.1266, MR 0412191.
- Ogus, Arthur (1979), "Supersingular K_{3} crystals", Journées de Géométrie Algébrique de Rennes (Rennes, 1978), Vol. II, Astérisque, vol. 64, Soc. Math. France, Paris, pp. 3–86, MR 0563467.
- Berthelot, Pierre; Ogus, Arthur (1983), "F-isocrystals and de Rham cohomology I", Inventiones Mathematicae, 72 (2): 159–199, Bibcode:1983InMat..72..159B, doi:10.1007/BF01389319, MR 0700767.
