= Supersingular prime (moonshine theory) =

Specific class of fifteen prime numbers

In moonshine theory, a supersingular prime is a prime number that divides the order of the Monster group $M$, which is the largest sporadic simple group. There are precisely fifteen supersingular prime numbers: the first eleven primes 2, 3, 5, 7, 11, 13, 17, 19, 23, 29, and 31; as well as 41, 47, 59, and 71 (sequence A002267 in the OEIS).

The non-supersingular primes are 37, 43, 53, 61, 67, and all primes greater than or equal to 73.

This usage of "supersingular prime" should not be confused with the related but distinct notion from algebraic number theory. In that context, a prime is called supersingular for a given elliptic curve $E$ if reducing $E$ modulo $p$ yields a supersingular elliptic curve—a property that depends on the choice of curve, and every elliptic curve over $\mathbb{Q}$ has infinitely many such primes. By contrast, the fifteen supersingular primes defined here are not relative to any particular curve: they are characterized by a condition on all supersingular elliptic curves in characteristic $p$ at once (see below), and happen to coincide with the prime divisors of the order of the Monster group.

== Characterization ==
Andrew Ogg (1975) proved that a prime number $p$ satisfies the following equivalent conditions:

1. The modular curve $X_0^+(p) = X_0(p)/w_p$, the quotient of $X_0(p)$ by the Fricke involution $w_p$, has genus zero.
2. Every supersingular elliptic curve in characteristic $p$ can be defined over the prime subfield $\mathbb{F}_p$.
3. $p$ is one of the fifteen primes listed above.

The connection to elliptic curves arises through condition (2). For any prime $p$, there are only finitely many $j$-invariants of supersingular elliptic curves in characteristic $p$; these $j$-invariants are the roots of the supersingular polynomial $ss_p(X) \in \mathbb{F}_p[X]$, and there are approximately $p/12$ of them (see supersingular elliptic curve). In general, these $j$-invariants may lie in extensions of $\mathbb{F}_p$ (specifically in $\mathbb{F}_{p^2}$). Condition (2) states that for the fifteen supersingular primes—and only for these primes—every supersingular $j$-invariant already lies in $\mathbb{F}_p$ itself. For larger primes, some supersingular $j$-invariants necessarily require the quadratic extension $\mathbb{F}_{p^2}$.

The equivalence of conditions (1) and (2) is a result in the arithmetic geometry of modular curves: the supersingular points on $X_0(p)$ in characteristic $p$ correspond to supersingular elliptic curves with a cyclic $p$-isogeny, and the genus of the quotient curve $X_0^+(p)$ controls whether all such points can be rational.

== Role in monstrous moonshine ==
Shortly after establishing the equivalence of conditions (1) and (2), Ogg attended a talk by Jacques Tits in which the conjectured existence of a sporadic simple group—later constructed as the Monster group by Robert Griess in 1982—was described, along with its predicted order. Ogg noticed that the prime factors of this predicted order were exactly the fifteen primes on his list, and offered a bottle of Jack Daniel's whiskey for an explanation of the coincidence. This observation, connecting the arithmetic of modular curves to the representation theory of sporadic groups, was one of the motivating problems for the theory of monstrous moonshine, later developed by Conway and Norton (1979) and proved by Richard Borcherds (1992).

== Other properties ==
All fifteen supersingular primes are Chen primes, but 37, 53, and 67 are also Chen primes without being supersingular, and there are infinitely many Chen primes greater than 73.

== See also ==
- Supersingular prime (algebraic number theory)
- Supersingular elliptic curve
- Monstrous moonshine
- Monster group
