= Prismatic cohomology =

Mathematical theory for p-adic formal schemes

In mathematics, specifically arithmetic geometry, prismatic cohomology is a cohomology introduced by Bhargav Bhatt and Peter Scholze for p-adic formal schemes. It generalizes various p-adic cohomology theories.

Fix a prime $p$. A prism is a pair $(A,I)$, where $A$ is a δ-ring with $p$-derivation $\delta_A$ and $I$ is an ideal of $A$ defining a Cartier divisor in $\operatorname{Spec}(A)$, such that $A$ is derived $(p,I)$-adically complete and the ideal $I+\phi_A(I)A$ contains $p$, where the associated map $\phi_A : A\to A$ given by
$$\phi_A(x) = x^p + p \delta_A(x)$$
is a ring homomorphism, which then necessarily lifts the Frobenius endomorphism on $A/(p)$.

== See also ==
- Crystalline cohomology
- Motivic cohomology
- de Rham cohomology
