= Hasse–Witt matrix =

In mathematics, the Hasse–Witt matrix H of a non-singular algebraic curve C over a finite field F is the matrix of the Frobenius mapping (p-th power mapping where F has q elements, q a power of the prime number p) with respect to a basis for the differentials of the first kind. It is a g × g matrix where C has genus g. The rank of the Hasse–Witt matrix is the Hasse or Hasse–Witt invariant.

== Approach to the definition ==
This definition, as given in the introduction, is natural in classical terms, and is due to Helmut Hasse and Ernst Witt (1936). It provides a solution to the question of the p-rank of the Jacobian variety J of C; the p-rank is bounded by the rank of H, specifically it is the rank of the Frobenius mapping composed with itself g times. It is also a definition that is in principle algorithmic. There has been substantial recent interest in this as of practical application to cryptography, in the case of C a hyperelliptic curve. The curve C is superspecial if H = 0.

That definition needs a couple of caveats, at least. Firstly, there is a convention about Frobenius mappings, and under the modern understanding what is required for H is the transpose of Frobenius (see arithmetic and geometric Frobenius for more discussion). Secondly, the Frobenius mapping is not F-linear; it is linear over the prime field Z/pZ in F. Therefore the matrix can be written down but does not represent a linear mapping in the straightforward sense.

== Cohomology ==
The interpretation for sheaf cohomology is this: the p-power map acts on

H^{1}(C,O_{C}),

or in other words the first cohomology of C with coefficients in its structure sheaf. This is now called the Cartier–Manin operator (sometimes just Cartier operator), for Pierre Cartier and Yuri Manin. The connection with the Hasse–Witt definition is by means of Serre duality, which for a curve relates that group to

H^{0}(C, Ω_{C})

where Ω_{C} = Ω^{1}_{C} is the sheaf of Kähler differentials on C.

== Abelian varieties and their p-rank ==
The p-rank of an abelian variety A over a field K of characteristic p is the integer k for which the kernel A[p] of multiplication by p has p^{k} points. It may take any value from 0 to d, the dimension of A; by contrast for any other prime number l there are l^{2d} points in A[l]. The reason that the p-rank is lower is that multiplication by p on A is an inseparable isogeny: the differential is p which is 0 in K. By looking at the kernel as a group scheme one can get the more complete structure (reference David Mumford Abelian Varieties pp. 146–7); but if for example one looks at reduction mod p of a division equation, the number of solutions must drop.

The rank of the Cartier–Manin operator, or Hasse–Witt matrix, therefore gives an upper bound for the p-rank. The p-rank is the rank of the Frobenius operator composed with itself g times. In the original paper of Hasse and Witt the problem is phrased in terms intrinsic to C, not relying on J. It is there a question of classifying the possible Artin–Schreier extensions of the function field F(C) (the analogue in this case of Kummer theory).

== Case of genus 1 ==
The case of elliptic curves was worked out by Hasse in 1934. Since the genus is 1, the only possibilities for the matrix H are: H is zero, Hasse invariant 0, p-rank 0, the supersingular case; or H non-zero, Hasse invariant 1, p-rank 1, the ordinary case. Here there is a congruence formula saying that H is congruent modulo p to the number N of points on C over F, at least when q = p. Because of Hasse's theorem on elliptic curves, knowing N modulo p determines N for p ≥ 5. This connection with local zeta-functions has been investigated in depth.

For a plane curve defined by a cubic f(X,Y,Z) = 0, the Hasse invariant is zero if and only if the coefficient of (XYZ)^{p−1} in f^{p−1} is zero.
