= Pierre Berthelot =

French mathematician (1943–2023)

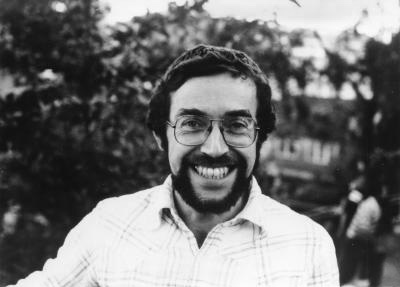
- Berthelot in 1981
- Born: 27 January 1943
- Died: 7 December 2023 (aged 80)
- Scientific career
- Fields: Mathematics
- Workplaces: University of Rennes
- Doctoral advisor: Alexander Grothendieck

Pierre Berthelot (English: /bɛərtəˈloʊ/ ber-tə-LOH, French: [pjɛʁ bɛʁtəlo]; 27 January 1943 – 7 December 2023) was a French mathematician at the University of Rennes. He developed crystalline cohomology and rigid cohomology.

== Publications ==
- Berthelot, Pierre; Alexandre Grothendieck; Luc Illusie, eds. (1971). Séminaire de Géométrie Algébrique du Bois Marie - 1966-67 - Théorie des intersections et théorème de Riemann-Roch - (SGA 6). Lecture Notes in Mathematics (in French). Vol. 225. Berlin; New York: Springer-Verlag. xii+700. doi:10.1007/BFb0066283. ISBN 978-3-540-05647-8. MR 0354655.
- Berthelot, Pierre Cohomologie cristalline des schémas de caractéristique p>0. Lecture Notes in Mathematics, Vol. 407. Springer-Verlag, Berlin-New York, 1974. 604 pp.
- Berthelot, Pierre; Ogus, Arthur Notes on crystalline cohomology. Princeton University Press, Princeton, N.J.; University of Tokyo Press, Tokyo, 1978. vi+243 pp. ISBN 0-691-08218-9

== Bibliography ==
- Home page of Pierre Berthelot
- Pierre Berthelot at the Mathematics Genealogy Project
