= F-crystal =

In algebraic geometry, F-crystals are objects introduced by Mazur (1972) that capture some of the structure of crystalline cohomology groups. The letter F stands for Frobenius, indicating that F-crystals have an action of Frobenius on them. F-isocrystals are crystals "up to isogeny".

== F-crystals and F-isocrystals over perfect fields ==
Suppose that k is a perfect field, with ring of Witt vectors W and let K be the quotient field of W, with Frobenius automorphism σ.

Over the field k, an F-crystal is a free module M of finite rank over the ring W of Witt vectors of k, together with a σ-linear injective endomorphism of M. An F-isocrystal is defined in the same way, except that M is a module for the quotient field K of W rather than W.

== Dieudonné–Manin classification theorem ==
The Dieudonné–Manin classification theorem was proved by Dieudonné (1955) and Manin (1963). It describes the structure of F-isocrystals over an algebraically closed field k. The category of such F-isocrystals is abelian and semisimple, so every F-isocrystal is a direct sum of simple F-isocrystals. The simple F-isocrystals are the modules E_{s/r} where r and s are coprime integers with r>0. The F-isocrystal E_{s/r} has a basis over K of the form v, Fv, F^{2}v,...,F^{r−1}v for some element v, and F^{r}v = p^{s}v. The rational number s/r is called the slope of the F-isocrystal.

Over a non-algebraically closed field k the simple F-isocrystals are harder to describe explicitly, but an F-isocrystal can still be written as a direct sum of subcrystals that are isoclinic, where an F-crystal is called isoclinic if over the algebraic closure of k it is a sum of F-isocrystals of the same slope.

== The Newton polygon of an F-isocrystal ==
The Newton polygon of an F-isocrystal encodes the dimensions of the pieces of given slope. If the F-isocrystal is a sum of isoclinic pieces with slopes s_{1} < s_{2} < ... and dimensions (as Witt ring modules) d_{1}, d_{2},... then the Newton polygon has vertices (0,0), (x_{1}, y_{1}), (x_{2}, y_{2}),... where the nth line segment joining the vertices has slope s_{n} = (y_{n}−y_{n−1})/(x_{n}−x_{n−1}) and projection onto the x-axis of length d_{n} = x_{n} − x_{n−1}.

== The Hodge polygon of an F-crystal ==
The Hodge polygon of an F-crystal M encodes the structure of M/FM considered as a module over the Witt ring. More precisely since the Witt ring is a principal ideal domain, the module M/FM can be written as a direct sum of indecomposable modules of lengths n_{1} ≤ n_{2} ≤ ... and the Hodge polygon then has vertices (0,0), (1,n_{1}), (2,n_{1}+ n_{2}), ...

While the Newton polygon of an F-crystal depends only on the corresponding isocrystal, it is possible for two F-crystals corresponding to the same F-isocrystal to have different Hodge polygons. The Hodge polygon has edges with integer slopes, while the Newton polygon has edges with rational slopes.

== Isocrystals over more general schemes ==
Suppose that A is a complete discrete valuation ring of characteristic 0 with quotient field k of characteristic p>0 and perfect. An affine enlargement of a scheme X_{0} over k consists of a torsion-free A-algebra B and an ideal I of B such that B is complete in the I topology and the image of I is nilpotent in B/pB, together with a morphism from Spec(B/I) to X_{0}. A convergent isocrystal over a k-scheme X_{0} consists of a module over B⊗Q for every affine enlargement B that is compatible with maps between affine enlargements (Faltings 1990).

An F-isocrystal (short for Frobenius isocrystal) is an isocrystal together with an isomorphism to its pullback under a Frobenius morphism.
