= Verschiebung operator =

Mathematical homomorphism

In mathematics, the Verschiebung or Verschiebung operator V is a homomorphism between affine commutative group schemes over a field of nonzero characteristic p. For finite group schemes it is the Cartier dual of the Frobenius homomorphism. It was introduced by Witt (1937) as the shift operator on Witt vectors taking (a_{0}, a_{1}, a_{2}, ...) to (0, a_{0}, a_{1}, ...). ("Verschiebung" is German for "shift", but the term "Verschiebung" is often used for this operator even in other languages.)

The Verschiebung operator V and the Frobenius operator F are related by FV = VF = [p], where [p] is the pth power homomorphism of an abelian group scheme.

== Examples ==
- If G is the discrete group with n elements over the finite field F_{p} of order p, then the Frobenius homomorphism F is the identity homomorphism and the Verschiebung V is the homomorphism [p] (multiplication by p in the group). Its dual is the group scheme of nth roots of unity, whose Frobenius homomorphism is [p] and whose Verschiebung is the identity homomorphism.
- For Witt vectors, the Verschiebung takes (a_{0}, a_{1}, a_{2}, ...) to (0, a_{0}, a_{1}, ...).
- On the Hopf algebra of symmetric functions, the Verschiebung V_{n} is the algebra endomorphism that takes the complete symmetric function h_{r} to h_{r/n} if n divides r and to 0 otherwise.

== See also ==
- Dieudonné module
