= Newton polytope =

The Newton polytope of the short Weierstrass equation $y^2 = x^3 + ax + b$. The green points correspond to the powers of the polynomials in the equations. Since there is one integer interior lattice point, then the genus of the equation also equals to one.

In mathematics, the Newton polytope is an integral polytope associated with a multivariate polynomial that can be used in the asymptotic analysis of those polynomials. It is a generalization of the Kruskal–Newton diagram developed for the analysis of bivariant polynomials.

Given a vector $\mathbf{x}=(x_1,\ldots,x_n)$ of variables and a finite family $(\mathbf{a}_k)_k$ of pairwise distinct vectors from $\mathbb{N}^n$ each encoding the exponents within a monomial, consider the multivariate polynomial

$$f(\mathbf{x})=\sum_k c_k\mathbf{x}^{\mathbf{a}_k}$$

where we use the shorthand notation $(x_1,\ldots,x_n)^{(y_1,\ldots,y_n)}$ for the monomial $x_1^{y_1}x_2^{y_2}\cdots x_n^{y_n}$. Then the Newton polytope associated to $f$ is the convex hull of the vectors $\mathbf{a}_k$; that is

$$\operatorname{Newt}(f)=\left\{\sum_k \alpha_k\mathbf{a}_k :\sum_k \alpha_k =1\;\&\;\forall j\,\,\alpha_j\geq0\right\}\!.$$

In order to make this well-defined, we assume that all coefficients $c_k$ are non-zero. The Newton polytope satisfies the following homomorphism-type property:
$$\operatorname{Newt}(fg)=\operatorname{Newt}(f)+\operatorname{Newt}(g)$$
where the addition is in the sense of Minkowski.

Newton polytopes are the central object of study in tropical geometry and characterize the Gröbner bases for an ideal.

== See also ==
- Toric varieties
- Hilbert scheme

== Sources ==
- Sturmfels, Bernd (1996). "2. The State Polytope". Gröbner Bases and Convex Polytopes. University Lecture Series. Vol. 8. Providence, RI: AMS. ISBN 0-8218-0487-1.
- Monical, Cara; Tokcan, Neriman; Yong, Alexander (2019). "Newton polytopes in algebraic combinatorics". Selecta Mathematica. New Series. 25 (5): 66. arXiv:1703.02583. doi:10.1007/s00029-019-0513-8. S2CID 53639491.
- Shiffman, Bernard; Zelditch, Steve (18 September 2003). "Random polynomials with prescribed Newton polytopes". Journal of the American Mathematical Society. 17 (1): 49–108. arXiv:math/0211391. doi:10.1090/S0894-0347-03-00437-5. S2CID 14886953.
