= Crystalline cohomology =

Weil cohomology theory for schemes X over a base field k

In mathematics, crystalline cohomology is a Weil cohomology theory for schemes $X$ over a base field $k$. Its values $H^n(X/W)$ are modules over the ring $W$ of Witt vectors over $k$. It was introduced by Alexander Grothendieck and developed by Pierre Berthelot.

Crystalline cohomology is partly inspired by Dwork's p-adic proof of part of the Weil conjectures and is closely related to the algebraic version of de Rham cohomology that was introduced by Grothendieck. Roughly speaking, crystalline cohomology of a variety $X$ in characteristic $p$ is the de Rham cohomology of a smooth lift of $X$ to characteristic 0, while de Rham cohomology of $X$ is the crystalline cohomology reduced mod $p$ (after taking into account higher Tors).

The idea of crystalline cohomology, roughly, is to replace the Zariski open sets of a scheme by infinitesimal thickenings of Zariski open sets with divided power structures. The motivation for this is that it can then be calculated by taking a local lifting of a scheme from characteristic $p$ to characteristic 0 and employing an appropriate version of algebraic de Rham cohomology.

Crystalline cohomology only works well for smooth proper schemes. Rigid cohomology extends it to more general schemes.

== Applications ==
For schemes in characteristic p, crystalline cohomology theory can handle questions about $p$-torsion in cohomology groups better than p-adic étale cohomology. This makes it a natural backdrop for much of the work on p-adic L-functions.

Crystalline cohomology, from the point of view of number theory, fills a gap in ℓ-adic cohomology, which occurs exactly where there are "equal characteristic primes". Traditionally the preserve of ramification theory, crystalline cohomology converts this situation into Dieudonné module theory, giving an important handle on arithmetic problems. Conjectures with wide scope on making this into formal statements were enunciated by Jean-Marc Fontaine, the resolution of which is called p-adic Hodge theory.

== Coefficients ==
For a variety $X$ over an algebraically closed field of characteristic $p > 0$, the $\ell$-adic cohomology groups for $\ell$ any prime number other than $p$ give satisfactory cohomology groups of $X$, with coefficients in the ring $\Z_\ell$ of $\ell$-adic integers. It is not possible in general to find similar cohomology groups with coefficients in $\Q_p$ (or $\Z_p$, or $\Q$, or $\Z$) having reasonable properties.

The classic reason (due to Serre) is that if $X$ is a supersingular elliptic curve, then its endomorphism ring is a maximal order in a quaternion algebra $B$ over $\Q$ ramified at $p$ and $\infty$. If $X$ had a cohomology group over $\Q_p$ of the expected dimension 2, then (the opposite algebra of) $B$ would act on this 2-dimensional space over $\Q_p$, which is impossible since $B$ is ramified at $p$.

Grothendieck's crystalline cohomology theory gets around this obstruction because it produces modules over the ring of Witt vectors of the ground field. So if the ground field is an algebraic closure of F_{p}, its values are modules over the $p$-adic completion of the maximal unramified extension of $\Z_p$, a much larger ring containing $n$th roots of unity for all $n$ not divisible by $p$, rather than over $\Z_p$.

== Motivation ==
One idea for defining a Weil cohomology theory of a variety $X$ over a field $k$ of characteristic $p$ is to "lift" it to a variety $X^*$ over the ring of Witt vectors of $k$ (that gives back $X$ on reduction mod p), then take the de Rham cohomology of this lift. The problem is that it is not at all obvious that this cohomology is independent of the choice of lifting.

The idea of crystalline cohomology in characteristic 0 is to find a direct definition of a cohomology theory as the cohomology of constant sheaves on a suitable site $\operatorname{Inf}(X)$ over $X$, called the infinitesimal site, and then show it is the same as the de Rham cohomology of any lift.

The site $\operatorname{Inf}(X)$ is a category whose objects can be thought of as some sort of generalization of the conventional open sets of $X$. In characteristic 0 its objects are infinitesimal thickenings $U\to T$ of Zariski open subsets $U$ of $X$. This means that $U$ is the closed subscheme of a scheme $T$ defined by a nilpotent sheaf of ideals on $T$; for example, $\operatorname{Spec}(k)\to \operatorname{Spec}(k[x]/(x^2))$.

Grothendieck showed that for smooth schemes $X$ over $\C$, the cohomology of the sheaf $\mathcal{O}_X$ on $\operatorname{Inf}(X)$ is the same as the usual (smooth or algebraic) de Rham cohomology.

== Crystalline cohomology ==
In characteristic $p$, the most obvious analogue of the crystalline site defined above in characteristic 0 does not work. The reason is roughly that in order to prove exactness of the de Rham complex, one needs some sort of Poincaré lemma, whose proof in turn uses integration, and integration requires various divided powers, which exist in characteristic 0 but not always in characteristic $p$. Grothendieck solved this problem by defining objects of the crystalline site of $X$ to be roughly infinitesimal thickenings of Zariski open subsets of $X$, together with a divided power structure giving the needed divided powers.

We will work over the ring $W_n=W/p^nW$ of Witt vectors of length $n$ over a perfect field $k$ of characteristic $p > 0$. For example, $k$ could be the finite field of order $p$, and $W_n$ is then the ring $\Z/p^n\Z$. (More generally one can work over a base scheme $S$ which has a fixed sheaf of ideals $I$ with a divided power structure.) If $X$ is a scheme over $k$, then the crystalline site of $X$ relative to $W_n$, denoted $\operatorname{Cris}(X/W_n)$, has as its objects pairs $U\to T$ consisting of a closed immersion of a Zariski open subset $U$ of $X$ into some $W_n$-scheme $T$ defined by a sheaf of ideals $J$, together with a divided power structure on $J$ compatible with the one on $W_n$.

Crystalline cohomology of a scheme $X$ over $k$ is defined to be the inverse limit

$$H^i(X/W)=\varprojlim H^i(X/W_n),$$

where

$$H^i(X/W_n)= H^i(\operatorname{Cris}(X/W_n),O)$$

is the cohomology of the crystalline site of $X/W_n$ with values in the sheaf of rings $\mathcal{O}_{W_n}$.

A key point of the theory is that the crystalline cohomology of a smooth scheme $X$ over $k$ can often be calculated in terms of the algebraic de Rham cohomology of a proper and smooth lifting of $X$ to a scheme $Z$ over $W$. There is a canonical isomorphism

$$H^i(X/W) = H^i_{DR}(Z/W) \quad(= H^i(Z,\Omega_{Z/W}^*)= \varprojlim H^i(Z,\Omega_{Z/W_n}^*))$$

of the crystalline cohomology of $X$ with the de Rham cohomology of $Z$ over the formal scheme of $W$ (an inverse limit of the hypercohomology of the complexes of differential forms). Conversely the de Rham cohomology of $X$ can be recovered as the reduction mod $p$ of its crystalline cohomology (after taking higher Tors into account).

== Crystals ==
If $X$ is a scheme over $S$ then the sheaf $\mathcal{O}_{X/S}$ is defined as the coordinate ring of $T$, where we write $T$ as an abbreviation for an object $U\to T$ of $\operatorname{Cris}(X/S)$.

A crystal on the site $\operatorname{Cris}(X/S)$ is a sheaf $F$ of $\mathcal{O}_{X/S}$ modules that is rigid in the following sense:

for any map $f$ between objects $T$, $T'$ of $\operatorname{Cris}(X/S)$, the natural map from $f^* F(T)$ to $F(T')$ is an isomorphism.

This is similar to the definition of a quasicoherent sheaf of modules in the Zariski topology.

An example of a crystal is the sheaf $\mathcal{O}_{X/S}$.

The term crystal attached to the theory, explained in Grothendieck's letter to Tate (1966), was a metaphor inspired by certain properties of algebraic differential equations. These had played a role in $p$-adic cohomology theories (precursors of the crystalline theory, introduced in various forms by Dwork, Monsky, Washnitzer, Lubkin and Katz) particularly in Dwork's work. Such differential equations can be formulated easily enough by means of the algebraic Koszul connections, but in the $p$-adic theory the analogue of analytic continuation is more mysterious (since $p$-adic discs tend to be disjoint rather than overlap). By decree, a crystal would have the 'rigidity' and the 'propagation' notable in the case of the analytic continuation of complex analytic functions. (Cf. also the rigid analytic spaces introduced by John Tate, in the 1960s, when these matters were actively being debated.)

== See also ==
- Motivic cohomology
- De Rham cohomology
