= List of things named after André Weil =

These are things named after André Weil (1906 – 1998), a French mathematician.

- Bergman–Weil formula
- Borel–Weil theorem
- Chern–Weil homomorphism
- Chern–Weil theory
- De Rham–Weil theorem
- Weil's explicit formula
- Hasse-Weil bound
- Hasse–Weil zeta function, and the related Hasse–Weil L-function
- Mordell–Weil group
- Mordell–Weil theorem
- Oka–Weil theorem
- Siegel–Weil formula
- Shafarevich–Weil theorem
- Taniyama–Shimura–Weil conjecture, now proved as the modularity theorem
- Weil algebra
- Weil–Brezin Map
- Weil–Châtelet group
- Weil cohomology
- Weil conjecture (disambiguation)
- Weil conjectures
- Weil conjecture on Tamagawa numbers
- Weil's criterion
- Weil–Deligne group scheme
- Weil distribution
- Weil divisor
- Weil group
- Weil height
- Weil number
- Weil pairing
- Weil–Petersson metric
- Weil reciprocity law
- Weil representation
- Weil restriction
