= Arithmetic zeta function =

Type of zeta function

In mathematics, the arithmetic zeta function is a zeta function associated with a scheme of finite type over integers. The arithmetic zeta function generalizes the Riemann zeta function and Dedekind zeta function to higher dimensions. The arithmetic zeta function is one of the most fundamental objects of number theory.

== Definition ==
The arithmetic zeta function ζ_{X} (s) is defined by an Euler product analogous to the Riemann zeta function:

$${\zeta_X(s)} = \prod_{x} \frac{1}{1 - N(x)^{-s}},$$

where the product is taken over all closed points x of the scheme X. Equivalently, the product is over all points whose residue field is finite. The cardinality of this field is denoted N(x).

== Examples and properties ==
=== Varieties over a finite field ===
If X is the spectrum of a finite field with q elements, then

$$\zeta_X(s) = \frac{1}{1-q^{-s}}.$$

For a variety X over a finite field, it is known by Grothendieck's trace formula that

$$\zeta_X(s) = Z(X, q^{-s})$$

where $Z(X, t)$ is a rational function (i.e., a quotient of polynomials).

Given two varieties X and Y over a finite field, the zeta function of $X \times Y$ is given by

$$Z(X, t) \star Z(Y, t)=Z(X \times Y, t),$$

where $\star$ denotes the multiplication in the ring $W(\mathbf Z)$ of Witt vectors of the integers.

=== Ring of integers ===
If X is the spectrum of the ring of integers, then ζ_{X} (s) is the Riemann zeta function. More generally, if X is the spectrum of the ring of integers of an algebraic number field, then ζ_{X} (s) is the Dedekind zeta function.

=== Zeta functions of disjoint unions ===
The zeta function of affine and projective spaces over a scheme X are given by

$$\begin{align}
\zeta_{\mathbf A^n(X)}(s) &= \zeta_X(s-n) \\
\zeta_{\mathbf P^n(X)}(s) &= \prod_{i=0}^n \zeta_X(s-i)
\end{align}$$

The latter equation can be deduced from the former using that, for any X that is the disjoint union of a closed and open subscheme U and V, respectively,

$$\zeta_X(s) = \zeta_U(s) \zeta_V(s).$$

Even more generally, a similar formula holds for infinite disjoint unions. In particular, this shows that the zeta function of X is the product of the ones of the reduction of X modulo the primes p:

$$\zeta_X(s) = \prod_p \zeta_{X_p}(s).$$

Such an expression ranging over each prime number is sometimes called Euler product and each factor is called Euler factor. In many cases of interest, the generic fiber X_{Q} is smooth. Then, only finitely many X_{p} are singular (bad reduction). For almost all primes, namely when X has good reduction, the Euler factor is known to agree with the corresponding factor of the Hasse–Weil zeta function of X_{Q}. Therefore, these two functions are closely related.

== Main conjectures ==
There are a number of conjectures concerning the behavior of the zeta function of a regular irreducible equidimensional scheme X (of finite type over the integers). Many (but not all) of these conjectures generalize the one-dimensional case of well known theorems about the Euler-Riemann-Dedekind zeta function.

The scheme need not be flat over Z, in this case it is a scheme of finite type over some F_{p}. This is referred to as the characteristic p case below. In the latter case, many of these conjectures (with the most notable exception of the Birch and Swinnerton-Dyer conjecture, i.e. the study of special values) are known. Very little is known for schemes that are flat over Z and are of dimension two and higher.

=== Meromorphic continuation and functional equation ===
Hasse and Weil conjectured that ζ_{X} (s) has a meromorphic continuation to the complex plane and satisfies a functional equation with respect to s → n − s where n is the absolute dimension of X.

This is proven for n = 1 and some very special cases when n > 1 for flat schemes over Z and for all n in positive characteristic. It is a consequence of the Weil conjectures (more precisely, the Riemann hypothesis part thereof) that the zeta function has a meromorphic continuation up to $\mathrm{Re}(s)>n-\tfrac{1}{2}$.

=== Generalized Riemann hypothesis ===
According to the generalized Riemann Hypothesis the zeros of ζ_{X} (s) are conjectured to lie inside the critical strip 0 ≤ Re(s) ≤ n lie on the vertical lines Re(s) = 1/2, 3/2, ... and the poles of ζ_{X} (s) inside the critical strip 0 ≤ Re(s) ≤ n lie on the vertical lines Re(s) = 0, 1, 2, ....

This was proved (Emil Artin, Helmut Hasse, André Weil, Alexander Grothendieck, Pierre Deligne) in positive characteristic for all n. It is not proved for any scheme that is flat over Z. The Riemann hypothesis is a partial case of Conjecture 2.

=== Pole orders ===
Subject to the analytic continuation, the order of the zero or pole and the residue of ζ_{X} (s) at integer points inside the critical strip is conjectured to be expressible by important arithmetic invariants of X. An argument due to Serre based on the above elementary properties and Noether normalization shows that the zeta function of X has a pole at s = n whose order equals the number of irreducible components of X with maximal dimension. Secondly, Tate conjectured

$$\mathrm{ord}_{s=n-1} \zeta_X(s) = rk \mathcal O_X^\times(X) - rk \mathrm{Pic}(X)$$

i.e., the pole order is expressible by the rank of the groups of invertible regular functions and the Picard group. The Birch and Swinnerton-Dyer conjecture is a partial case of this conjecture. In fact, this conjecture of Tate's is equivalent to a generalization of Birch and Swinnerton-Dyer.

More generally, Soulé conjectured

$$\mathrm{ord}_{s=n-m} \zeta_X(s) = - \sum_i (-1)^i rk K_i (X)^{(m)}$$

The right hand side denotes the Adams eigenspaces of algebraic K-theory of X. These ranks are finite under the Bass conjecture.

These conjectures are known when n = 1, that is, the case of number rings and curves over finite fields. As for n > 1, partial cases of the Birch and Swinnerton-Dyer conjecture have been proven, but even in positive characteristic the conjecture remains open.

== Methods and theories ==
The arithmetic zeta function of a regular connected equidimensional arithmetic scheme of Kronecker dimension n can be factorized into the product of appropriately defined L-factors and an auxiliary factor. Hence, results on L-functions imply corresponding results for the arithmetic zeta functions. However, there are still very few proven results about the L-factors of arithmetic schemes in characteristic zero and dimensions 2 and higher. Ivan Fesenko initiated a theory which studies the arithmetic zeta functions directly, without working with their L-factors. It is a higher-dimensional generalisation of Tate's thesis, i.e. it uses higher adele groups, higher zeta integral and objects which come from higher class field theory. In this theory, the meromorphic continuation and functional equation of proper regular models of elliptic curves over global fields is related to mean-periodicity property of a boundary function. In his joint work with M. Suzuki and G. Ricotta a new correspondence in number theory is proposed, between the arithmetic zeta functions and mean-periodic functions in the space of smooth functions on the real line of not more than exponential growth. This correspondence is related to the Langlands correspondence. Two other applications of Fesenko's theory are to the poles of the zeta function of proper models of elliptic curves over global fields and to the special value at the central point.
