= Weil conjecture =

The term Weil conjecture may refer to:

- The Weil conjectures about zeta functions of varieties over finite fields, proved by Dwork, Grothendieck, Deligne and others.
- The Taniyama–Shimura–Weil conjecture about elliptic curves, proved by Wiles and others.
- The Weil conjecture on Tamagawa numbers about the Tamagawa number of an algebraic group, proved by Kottwitz and others.
- The Hasse–Weil conjecture about zeta functions.
