= Grothendieck trace formula =

Expresses the number of points of a variety over a finite field

In algebraic geometry, the Grothendieck trace formula expresses the number of points of a variety over a finite field in terms of the trace of the Frobenius endomorphism on its cohomology groups. There are several generalizations: the Frobenius endomorphism can be replaced by a more general endomorphism, in which case the points over a finite field are replaced by its fixed points, and there is also a more general version for a sheaf over the variety, where the cohomology groups are replaced by cohomology with coefficients in the sheaf.

The Grothendieck trace formula is an analogue in algebraic geometry of the Lefschetz fixed-point theorem in algebraic topology.

One application of the Grothendieck trace formula is to express the zeta function of a variety over a finite field, or more generally the L-series of a sheaf, as a sum over traces of Frobenius on cohomology groups. This is one of the steps used in the proof of the Weil conjectures.

Behrend's trace formula generalizes the formula to algebraic stacks.

== Formal statement for L-functions ==
Let k be a finite field, l a prime number invertible in k, X a smooth k-scheme of dimension n, and $\mathcal{F}$ a constructible $\mathbb{Q}_l$-sheaf on X. Then the following cohomological expression for the L-function of $\mathcal{F}$ holds:

$$L(X, \mathcal{F}, t) = \prod_{i=0}^{2n} \det(1 - t\cdot F \,\, | \,\, H^i_c(X_{\bar{k}}, \mathcal{F}))^{(-1)^{i+1}} = \frac{\det(1 - t \cdot F \,\, | \,\, H^1_c(X_{\bar{k}}, \mathcal{F})) \cdots \det(1 - t \cdot F \,\, | \,\, H^{2n-1}_c(X_{\bar{k}}, \mathcal{F}))}{\det(1 - t \cdot F \,\, | \,\, H^0_c(X_{\bar{k}}, \mathcal{F})) \cdots \det(1 - t \cdot F \,\, | \,\, H^{2n}_c(X_{\bar{k}}, \mathcal{F}))}$$

where F is everywhere a geometric Frobenius action on l-adic cohomology with compact supports of the sheaf $\mathcal{F}$. Taking logarithmic derivatives of both formal power series produces a statement on sums of traces for each finite field extension E of the base field k:

$$\sum_{x \in X(E)} \operatorname{tr}(F_E \,\, | \,\, \mathcal{F}_x) = \sum_{i=0}^{2n}(-1)^{i}\operatorname{tr}(F_E \,\, | \,\, H^i_c(X_{\bar{k}}, \mathcal{F}))$$

For a constant sheaf $\mathbb{Q}_l$ (viewed as $(\varprojlim \mathbb{Z}/l^n\mathbb{Z}) \otimes \mathbb{Q}$ to qualify as an l-adic sheaf) the left hand side of this formula is the number of E-points of X.
