= Local zeta function =

Function associated with an algebraic variety

In mathematics, the local zeta function Z(V, s) (sometimes called the congruent zeta function or the Hasse–Weil zeta function) is defined as

$$Z(V, s) = \exp\left(\sum_{k = 1}^\infty \frac{N_k}{k} (q^{-s})^k\right),$$

where V is a non-singular n-dimensional projective algebraic variety over the field F_{q} with q elements and N_{k} is the number of points of V defined over the finite field extension F_{q^{k}} of F_{q}.

Making the variable transformation t = q^{−s} gives

$$\mathit{Z} (V,t) = \exp
\left( \sum_{k=1}^{\infty} N_k \frac{t^k}{k} \right)$$

as the formal power series in the variable $t$.

Equivalently, the local zeta function is sometimes defined as follows:

$$(1)\ \ \mathit{Z} (V,0) = 1 \,$$
$$(2)\ \ \frac{d}{dt} \log \mathit{Z} (V,t) = \sum_{k=1}^{\infty} N_k t^{k-1}\ .$$

In other words, the local zeta function Z(V, t) with coefficients in the finite field F_{q} is defined as a function whose logarithmic derivative generates the number N_{k} of solutions of the equation defining V in the degree k extension F_{q^{k}}.

== Formulation ==
Given a finite field F, there is, up to isomorphism, only one field F_{k} with

$$[ F_k : F ] = k \,$$,

for k = 1, 2, ... . When F is the unique field with q elements, F_{k} is the unique field with $q^k$ elements. Given an algebraic variety V defined over F, we can count the number $N_k \,$of solutions in F_{k} and create the generating function

$$G(t) = \frac{N_1}{1}t + \frac{N_2}{2}t^2 + \frac{N_3}{3}t^3 +\cdots \,$$.

The correct definition for Z(t) is to set log(Z) = G, so

$$Z= \exp (G(t)) \,$$

and Z(0) = 1, since G(0) = 0, and Z(t) is a priori a formal power series.

The logarithmic derivative

$$\frac{d}{dt} \log(Z(t)) = \frac{Z'(t)}{Z(t)}$$

equals the generating function

$$G'(t) = N_1 +N_2t^1 + N_3t^2 +\cdots \,$$.

== Examples ==
For example, assume all the N_{k} are 1; this happens for example if we start with an equation like X = 0, so that geometrically we are taking V to be a point. Then

$$G(t) = -\log(1 - t)$$

is the expansion of a logarithm (for |t| < 1). In this case we have

$$Z(t) = \frac{1}{(1 - t)}\ .$$

To take something more interesting, let V be the projective line over F. If F has q elements, then this has q + 1 points, including the one point at infinity. Therefore, we have

$$N_k = q^k + 1$$

and

$$G(t) = -\log(1 - t) -\log(1 - qt)$$

for |t| small enough, and therefore

$$Z(t) = \frac{1}{(1 - t)(1 - qt)}\ .$$

The first study of these functions was in the 1923 dissertation of Emil Artin. He obtained results for the case of a hyperelliptic curve, and conjectured the further main points of the theory as applied to curves. The theory was then developed by F. K. Schmidt and Helmut Hasse. The earliest known nontrivial cases of local zeta functions were implicit in Carl Friedrich Gauss's Disquisitiones Arithmeticae, article 358. There, certain particular examples of elliptic curves over finite fields having complex multiplication have their points counted by means of cyclotomy.

For the definition and some examples, see also.

== Motivations ==
The relationship between the definitions of G and Z can be explained in a number of ways. (See for example the infinite product formula for Z below.) In practice it makes Z a rational function of t, something that is interesting even in the case of V an elliptic curve over a finite field.

The local zeta functions Z are multiplied to get global zeta functions $\zeta = \prod Z.$ These generally involve different finite fields (for example the whole family of fields Z/pZ as p runs over all prime numbers). In these fields, the variable t is substituted by p^{−s}, where s is the complex variable traditionally used in Dirichlet series. (For details, see Hasse–Weil zeta function.) The global products of Z in the two cases used as examples in the previous section therefore come out as $\zeta(s)$ and $\zeta(s)\zeta(s-1)$ after letting $q=p$.

== Riemann hypothesis for curves over finite fields ==
For projective curves C over F that are non-singular, it can be shown that

$$Z(t) = \frac{P(t)}{(1 - t)(1 - qt)}\ ,$$

with P(t) a polynomial, of degree 2g, where g is the genus of C. Rewriting

$$P(t)=\prod^{2g}_{i=1}(1-\omega_i t)\ ,$$

the Riemann hypothesis for curves over finite fields states

$$|\omega_i|=q^{1/2}.$$

For example, for the elliptic curve case, there are two roots, and it is easy to show the absolute values of the roots are q^{1/2}. Hasse's theorem is that they have the same absolute value; this has immediate consequences for the number of points.

André Weil proved this for the general case, around 1940 (Comptes Rendus note, April 1940): he spent much time in the years after that writing up the algebraic geometry involved. This led him to the general Weil conjectures. Alexander Grothendieck developed scheme theory for the purpose of resolving these. A generation later, Pierre Deligne completed the proof. (See étale cohomology for the basic formulae of the general theory.)

== General formulas for the zeta function ==
It is a consequence of the Lefschetz trace formula for the Frobenius morphism that

$$Z(X,t)=\prod_{i=0}^{2\dim X}\det\big(1-t \mbox{Frob}_q |H^i_c(\overline{X},{\mathbb Q}_\ell)\big)^{(-1)^{i+1}}.$$

Here, $X$ is a separated scheme of finite type over the finite field F with $q$ elements, and Frob_{q} is the geometric Frobenius acting on $\ell$-adic étale cohomology with compact supports of $\overline{X}$, the lift of $X$ to the algebraic closure of the field F. This shows that the zeta function is a rational function of $t$.

An infinite product formula for $Z(X, t)$ is

$$Z(X, t)=\prod\ (1-t^{\deg(x)})^{-1}.$$

Here, the product ranges over all closed points x of X, and deg(x) is the degree of x. The local zeta function Z(X, t) is viewed as a function of the complex variable s via the change of variables q^{−s}.

In the case where X is the variety V discussed above, the closed points are the equivalence classes x=[P] of points P on $\overline{V}$, where two points are equivalent if they are conjugates over F. The degree of x is the degree of the field extension of F generated by the coordinates of P. The logarithmic derivative of the infinite product Z(X, t) is easily seen to be the generating function discussed above, namely

$$N_1 +N_2t^1 + N_3t^2 +\cdots \,$$.

== See also ==
- List of zeta functions
- Weil conjectures
- Elliptic curve
