= ℓ-adic sheaf =

In algebraic geometry, an ℓ-adic sheaf on a Noetherian scheme X is an inverse system consisting of $\mathbb{Z}/\ell^n$-modules $F_n$ in the étale topology and $F_{n+1} \to F_n$ inducing $F_{n+1} \otimes_{\mathbb{Z}/\ell^{n+1}} \mathbb{Z}/\ell^n \overset{\simeq}\to F_n$.

Bhatt–Scholze's pro-étale topology gives an alternative approach.

== Motivation ==
The development of étale cohomology as a whole was fueled by the desire to produce a 'topological' theory of cohomology for algebraic varieties, i.e. a Weil cohomology theory that works in any characteristic. An essential feature of such a theory is that it admits coefficients in a field of characteristic 0. However, constant étale sheaves with no torsion have no interesting cohomology. For example, if $X$ is a smooth variety over a field $k$, then $H^i(X_\text{ét},\mathbb{Q})=0$ for all positive $i$. On the other hand, the constant sheaves $\mathbb{Z}/m$ do produce the 'correct' cohomology, as long as $m$ is invertible in the ground field $k$. So one takes a prime $\ell$ for which this is true and defines $\ell$-adic cohomology as $H^i(X_\text{ét}, \mathbb{Z}_\ell):= \varprojlim_n H^i(X_\text{ét}, \mathbb{Z}/\ell^n)$, and $H^i(X_\text{ét}, \mathbb{Q}_\ell):= \varprojlim_n H^i(X_\text{ét}, \mathbb{Z}/\ell^n)\otimes \mathbb Q$.

This definition, however, is not completely satisfactory: As in the classical case of topological spaces, one might want to consider cohomology with coefficients in a local system of $\mathbb{Q}_\ell$-vector spaces, and there should be a category equivalence between such local systems and continuous $\mathbb{Q}_\ell$-representations of the étale fundamental group.

Another problem with the definition above is that it behaves well only when $k$ is a separably closed. In this case, all the groups occurring in the inverse limit are finitely generated and taking the limit is exact. But if $k$ is for example a number field, the cohomology groups $H^i(X_\text{ét}, \mathbb{Z}/\ell^n)$ will often be infinite and the limit not exact, which causes issues with functoriality. For instance, there is in general no Hochschild-Serre spectral sequence relating $H^i(X_\text{ét}, \mathbb{Z}_\ell)$ to the Galois cohomology of $H^i((X_{k^\text{sep}})_\text{ét}, \mathbb{Z}_\ell)$.

These considerations lead one to consider the category of inverse systems of sheaves as described above. One has then the desired equivalence of categories with representations of the fundamental group (for $\mathbb Z_\ell$-local systems, and when $X$ is normal for $\Q_\ell$-systems as well), and the issue in the last paragraph is resolved by so-called continuous étale cohomology, where one takes the derived functor of the composite functor of taking the limit over global sections of the system.

== Constructible and lisse ℓ-adic sheaves ==
An ℓ-adic sheaf $\{ F_n \}_{\ge 0}$ is said to be

- constructible if each $F_n$ is constructible.
- lisse if each $F_n$ is constructible and locally constant.

Some authors (e.g., those of SGA 4 1/2) assume an ℓ-adic sheaf to be constructible.

Given a connected scheme X with a geometric point x, SGA 1 defines the étale fundamental group $\pi^{\text{ét}}_1(X, x)$ of X at x to be the group classifying finite Galois coverings of X. Then the category of lisse ℓ-adic sheaves on X is equivalent to the category of continuous representations of $\pi^{\text{ét}}_1(X, x)$ on finite free $\mathbb{Z}_l$-modules. This is an analog of the correspondence between local systems and continuous representations of the fundamental group in algebraic topology (because of this, a lisse ℓ-adic sheaf is sometimes also called a local system).

== ℓ-adic cohomology ==
An ℓ-adic cohomology group is an inverse limit of étale cohomology groups with certain torsion coefficients.

== The "derived category" of constructible ℓ-adic sheaves ==
In a way similar to that for ℓ-adic cohomology, the derived category of constructible $\overline{\mathbb{Q}}_\ell$-sheaves is defined essentially as $D^b_c(X, \overline{\mathbb{Q}}_\ell) := (\varprojlim_n D^b_c(X, \mathbb{Z}/\ell^n)) \otimes_{\mathbb{Z}_\ell} \overline{\mathbb{Q}}_\ell.$

Bhatt & Scholze 2013 writes "in daily life, one pretends (without getting into much trouble) that $D^b_c(X, \overline{\mathbb{Q}}_\ell)$ is simply the full subcategory of some hypothetical derived category $D(X, \overline{\mathbb{Q}}_\ell)$ ..."

== See also ==
- Fourier–Deligne transform
- Motivic sheaf
