= Athénée Adolphe Max =

School in Brussels, Belgium

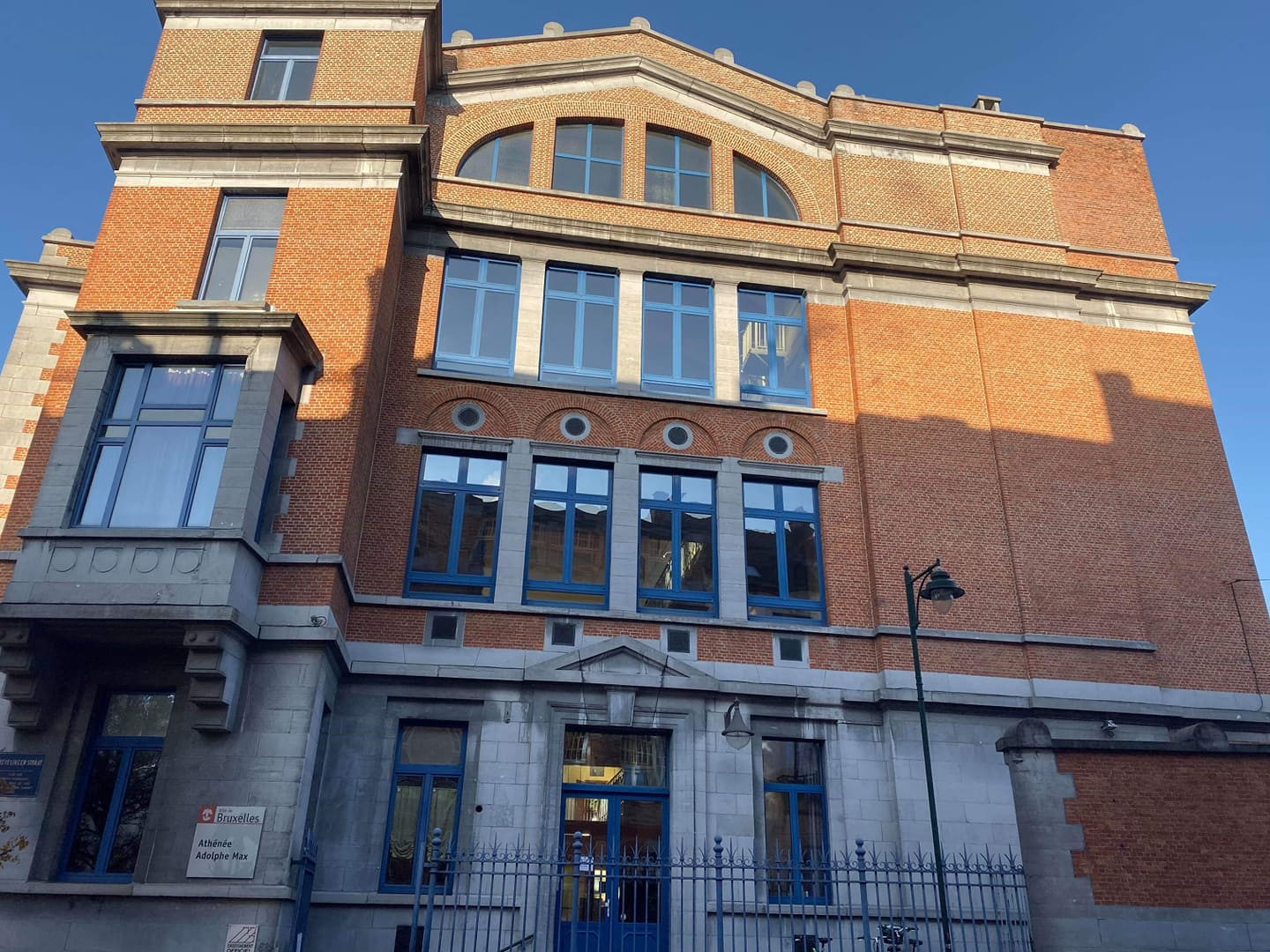

Location
- Bd Clovis 40, 1000 Brussels; Belgium
- Coordinates: 50.8494°N 4.3821°E

Information
- Type: Public school
- School district: Brussels-Capital Region
- Language: French
- Website: adolphemax.be

The Athénée Adolphe Max (AAM) is a French-language secondary school in Brussels, Belgium, which is part of the official education network. It is located to the east of the City of Brussels, near the Squares Quarter.

== History ==
A first building was designed in 1904 by the architect Edmond De Vigne. In 1909, two secular schools were created. A first Carter high school for girls, later named Carter in homage to the first director, and an athenaeum for boys, later named the Athénée Adolphe Max after the mayor of Brussels Adolphe Max. In 1978, the two secondary schools merged into a single athenaeum and adopted the name Athénée Adolphe Max in 1990.

== Description ==
The Athénée Adolphe Max is a school based on the promotion of effort in a respectful setting. The objective of the athenaeum is to transmit quality training to develop their intellectual and moral skills so that they have the level to approach higher education successfully.

The school has two courtyards:

- the Carter courtyard made up of three floors in which the Athénée Adolphe Max for boys was once located.
- the Max courtyard made up of three floors in which the Athénée Adolphe Max for boys was once located.

The establishment has a parents' association (APMAX) and an active Amnesty school group.

== Famous alumni ==
- Pierre Deligne, mathematician
- Plastic Bertrand, singer and television presenter
