= Fourier–Deligne transform =

In algebraic geometry, the Fourier–Deligne transform, or ℓ-adic Fourier transform, or geometric Fourier transform, is an operation on objects of the derived category of ℓ-adic sheaves over the affine line. It was introduced by Pierre Deligne on November 29, 1976 in a letter to David Kazhdan as an analogue of the usual Fourier transform. It was used by Gérard Laumon to simplify Deligne's proof of the Weil conjectures.
