= Foundations of Algebraic Geometry =

1946 book by André Weil

- Author: André Weil
- Subject: Mathematics
- Genre: Non-fiction
- Publication date: 1946

Foundations of Algebraic Geometry is a book by André Weil (1946, 1962) that develops algebraic geometry over fields of any characteristic. In particular it gives a careful treatment of intersection theory by defining the local intersection multiplicity of two subvarieties.

Weil was motivated by the need for a rigorous theory of correspondences on algebraic curves in positive characteristic, which he used in his proof of the Riemann hypothesis for curves over finite fields.

Weil introduced abstract rather than projective varieties partly so that he could construct the Jacobian of a curve. (It was not known at the time that Jacobians are always projective varieties.) It was some time before anyone found any examples of complete abstract varieties that are not projective.

In the 1950s Weil's work was one of several competing attempts to provide satisfactory foundations for algebraic geometry, all of which were superseded by Grothendieck's development of schemes.

== See also ==
- Weil cohomology theory
