= Weil's conjecture on Tamagawa numbers =

Conjecture in algebraic geometry

In mathematics, the Weil conjecture on Tamagawa numbers is the statement that the Tamagawa number $\tau(G)$ of a simply connected simple algebraic group defined over a number field is 1. In this case, simply connected means "not having a proper algebraic covering" in the algebraic group theory sense, which is not always the topologists' meaning.

== History ==
Weil (1959) calculated the Tamagawa number in many cases of classical groups and observed that it is an integer in all considered cases and that it was equal to 1 in the cases when the group is simply connected. The first observation does not hold for all groups: Ono (1963) found examples where the Tamagawa numbers are not integers. The second observation, that the Tamagawa numbers of simply connected semisimple groups seem to be 1, became known as the Weil conjecture.

Robert Langlands (1966) introduced harmonic analysis methods to show it for Chevalley groups. K. F. Lai (1980) extended the class of known cases to quasisplit reductive groups. Kottwitz (1988) proved it for all groups satisfying the Hasse principle, which at the time was known for all groups without E_{8} factors. V. I. Chernousov (1989) removed this restriction, by proving the Hasse principle for the resistant E_{8} case (see strong approximation in algebraic groups), thus completing the proof of Weil's conjecture. In 2011, Jacob Lurie and Dennis Gaitsgory announced a proof of the conjecture for algebraic groups over function fields over finite fields, with part of the argument published in Gaitsgory & Lurie (2019), and planned to be completed in a second volume using the Grothendieck-Lefschetz trace formula and the Ran space.

== Applications ==
Ono (1965) used the Weil conjecture to calculate the Tamagawa numbers of all semisimple algebraic groups.

For spin groups, the conjecture implies the known Smith–Minkowski–Siegel mass formula.

== See also ==
- Tamagawa number
