= Tsuneo Tamagawa =

Japanese mathematician

Tsuneo Tamagawa (Japanese: 玉河 恒夫, Tamagawa Tsuneo, 11 December 1925 in Tokyo – 30 December 2017 in New Haven, Connecticut) was a mathematician. He worked on the arithmetic of classical groups.

Tamagawa received his PhD in 1954 at the University of Tokyo under Shōkichi Iyanaga. Tamagawa was a visiting scholar at the Institute for Advanced Study in 1955/6, 1958, and 1970. He was on the Yale University faculty starting in 1963, and became emeritus in 1996.

He introduced the Tamagawa numbers, which are measures for algebraic groups over algebraic number fields. These measures play an essential role in conjectures on arithmetic algebraic geometry, such as those of Spencer Bloch and Kazuya Kato.

Tamagawa's doctoral students included Doris Schattschneider and Audrey Terras.

== See also ==
- Tamagawa number
