= Weil reciprocity law =

In mathematics, the Weil reciprocity law is a result of André Weil holding in the function field K(C) of an algebraic curve C over an algebraically closed field K. Given functions f and g in K(C), i.e. rational functions on C, then

f((g)) = g((f))

where the notation has this meaning: (h) is the divisor of the function h, or in other words the formal sum of its zeroes and poles counted with multiplicity; and a function applied to a formal sum means the product (with multiplicities, poles counting as a negative multiplicity) of the values of the function at the points of the divisor. With this definition there must be the side-condition, that the divisors of f and g have disjoint support (which can be removed).

In the case of the projective line, this can be proved by manipulations with the resultant of polynomials.

To remove the condition of disjoint support, for each point P on C a local symbol

(f, g)_{P}

is defined, in such a way that the statement given is equivalent to saying that the product over all P of the local symbols is 1. When f and g both take the values 0 or ∞ at P, the definition is essentially in limiting or removable singularity terms, by considering (up to sign)

f^{a}g^{b}

with a and b such that the function has neither a zero nor a pole at P. This is achieved by taking a to be the multiplicity of g at P, and −b the multiplicity of f at P. The definition is then

(f, g)_{P} = (−1)^{ab} f^{a}g^{b}.

See for example Jean-Pierre Serre, Groupes algébriques et corps de classes, pp. 44–46, for this as a special case of a theory on mapping algebraic curves into commutative groups.

There is a generalisation of Serge Lang to abelian varieties (Lang, Abelian Varieties).
