= Constructible sheaf =

In mathematics, a constructible sheaf is a sheaf of abelian groups over some topological space X, such that X is the union of a finite number of locally closed subsets on each of which the sheaf is a locally constant sheaf. It has its origins in algebraic geometry, where in étale cohomology constructible sheaves are defined in a similar way (Artin, Grothendieck & Verdier 1972, Exposé IX § 2). For the derived category of constructible sheaves, see a section in ℓ-adic sheaf.

The finiteness theorem in étale cohomology states that the higher direct images of a constructible sheaf are constructible.

== Definition of étale constructible sheaves on a scheme X ==
Here we use the definition of constructible étale sheaves from the book by Freitag and Kiehl referenced below. In what follows in this subsection, all sheaves $\mathcal{F}$ on schemes $X$ are étale sheaves unless otherwise noted.

A sheaf $\mathcal{F}$ is called constructible if $X$ can be written as a finite union of locally closed subschemes $i_Y:Y \to X$ such that for each subscheme $Y$ of the covering, the sheaf $\mathcal{F}|_{Y} = i_{Y}^{\ast}\mathcal{F}$ is a finite locally constant sheaf. In particular, this means for each subscheme $Y$ appearing in the finite covering, there is an étale covering $\lbrace U_i \to Y \mid i \in I \rbrace$ such that for all étale subschemes in the cover of $Y$, the sheaf $(i_Y)^{\ast}\mathcal{F}|_{U_i}$ is constant and represented by a finite set.

This definition allows us to derive, from Noetherian induction and the fact that an étale sheaf is constant if and only if its restriction from $X$ to $X_\text{red}$ is constant as well, where $X_\text{red}$ is the reduction of the scheme $X$. It then follows that a representable étale sheaf $\mathcal{F}$ is itself constructible.

Of particular interest to the theory of constructible étale sheaves is the case in which one works with constructible étale sheaves of Abelian groups. The remarkable result is that constructible étale sheaves of Abelian groups are precisely the Noetherian objects in the category of all torsion étale sheaves (cf. Proposition I.4.8 of Freitag-Kiehl).

== Examples in algebraic topology ==
Most examples of constructible sheaves come from intersection cohomology sheaves or from the derived pushforward of a local system on a family of topological spaces parameterized by a base space.

=== Derived pushforward on P^{1} ===
One nice set of examples of constructible sheaves come from the derived pushforward (with or without compact support) of a local system on $U = \mathbb{P}^1-\{0,1,\infty\}$. Since any loop around $\infty$ is homotopic to a loop around $0,1$ we only have to describe the monodromy around $0$ and $1$. For example, we can set the monodromy operators to be

$$\begin{align}
T_0 = \begin{bmatrix}
1 & k \\
0 & 1
\end{bmatrix}, \quad & T_1 = \begin{bmatrix}
1 & l \\
0 & 1
\end{bmatrix}
\end{align}$$

where the stalks of our local system $\mathcal{L}$ are isomorphic to $\mathbb{Q}^{\oplus 2}$. Then, if we take the derived pushforward $\mathbf{R}j_*$ or $\mathbf{R}j_!$ of $\mathcal{L}$ for $j: U \to \mathbb{P}^1$ we get a constructible sheaf where the stalks at the points $0,1,\infty$ compute the cohomology of the local systems restricted to a neighborhood of them in $U$.

=== Weierstrass family of elliptic curves ===
For example, consider the family of degenerating elliptic curves

$$y^2 - x(x-1)(x-t)$$

over $\mathbb{C}$. At $t=0,1$ this family of curves degenerates into a nodal curve. If we denote this family by $\pi:X \to \mathbb{C}$ then

$$\mathbf{R}^0\pi_*(\underline{\mathbb{Q}}_X) \cong \mathbf{R}^2\pi_*(\underline{\mathbb{Q}}_X) \cong \underline{\mathbb{Q}}_{\mathbb{C}}$$

and

$$\mathbf{R}^1\pi_*(\underline{\mathbb{Q}}_X) \cong \mathcal{L}_{\mathbb{C}-\{0,1 \}}\oplus \underline{\mathbb{Q}}_{\{0,1 \}}$$

where the stalks of the local system $\mathcal{L}_{\mathbb{C}-\{0,1 \}}$ are isomorphic to $\mathbb{Q}^2$. This local monodromy around of this local system around $0,1$ can be computed using the Picard–Lefschetz formula.
