= Weil restriction =

Restriction of scalars

In mathematics, restriction of scalars (also known as "Weil restriction") is a functor which, for any finite extension of fields L/k and any algebraic variety X over L, produces another variety Res_{L/k}X, defined over k. It is useful for reducing questions about varieties over large fields to questions about more complicated varieties over smaller fields.

== Definition ==
Let L/k be a finite extension of fields, and X a variety defined over L. The functor $\operatorname{Res}_{L/k} X$ from k-schemes^{op} to sets is defined by

$$\operatorname{Res}_{L/k}X(S) = X(S \times_k L)$$

(In particular, the k-rational points of $\operatorname{Res}_{L/k}X$ are the L-rational points of X.) The variety that represents this functor is called the restriction of scalars, and is unique up to unique isomorphism if it exists.

From the standpoint of sheaves of sets, restriction of scalars is just a pushforward along the morphism $\operatorname{Spec}(L) \to \operatorname{Spec}(k)$ and is right adjoint to fiber product of schemes, so the above definition can be rephrased in much more generality. In particular, one can replace the extension of fields by any morphism of ringed topoi, and the hypotheses on X can be weakened to e.g. stacks. This comes at the cost of having less control over the behavior of the restriction of scalars.

=== Alternative definition ===
Let $h:S'\to S$ be a morphism of schemes. For a $S'$-scheme $X$, if the contravariant functor

$$\operatorname{Res}_{S'/S}(X):\mathbf{Sch/S}^{op}\to \mathbf{Set},\quad T\mapsto \operatorname{Hom}_{S'}(T\times_S S',X)$$

is representable, then we call the corresponding $S$-scheme, which we also denote with $\operatorname{Res}_{S'/S}(X)$, the Weil restriction of $X$ with respect to $h$.

Where $\mathbf{Sch/S}^{op}$ denotes the dual of the category of schemes over a fixed scheme $S$.

== Properties ==
For any finite extension of fields, the restriction of scalars takes quasiprojective varieties to quasiprojective varieties. The dimension of the resulting variety is multiplied by the degree of the extension.

Under appropriate hypotheses (e.g., flat, proper, finitely presented), any morphism $T \to S$ of algebraic spaces yields a restriction of scalars functor that takes algebraic stacks to algebraic stacks, preserving properties such as Artin, Deligne-Mumford, and representability.

== Examples and applications ==
Simple examples are the following:

1. Let L be a finite extension of k of degree s. Then $\operatorname{Res}_{L/k}(\operatorname{Spec} (L)) = \operatorname{Spec}(k)$ and $\operatorname{Res}_{L/k}\mathbb{A}^1$ is an s-dimensional affine space $\mathbb{A}^s$ over Spec k.
2. If X is an affine L-variety, defined by
  $$X = \operatorname{Spec} L[x_1, \dots, x_n]/(f_1,\dotsc,f_m);$$
  we can write $\operatorname{Res}_{L/k}X$ as Spec $k[y_{i,j}]/(g_{l,r})$, where $y_{i,j}$ ($1 \leq i \leq n, 1 \leq j \leq s$) are new variables, and $g_{l,r}$ ($1 \leq l \leq m, 1 \leq r \leq s$) are polynomials in $y_{i,j}$ given by taking a k-basis $e_1, \dotsc, e_s$ of L and setting $x_i = y_{i,1}e_1 + \dotsb + y_{i,s}e_s$ and $f_t = g_{t,1}e_1 + \dotsb + g_{t,s}e_s$.

If a scheme is a group scheme then any Weil restriction of it will be as well. This is frequently used in number theory, for instance:

1. The torus
  $$\mathbb{S} := \operatorname{Res}_{\Complex/\R} \mathbb{G}_m$$
  where $\mathbb{G}_m$ denotes the multiplicative group, plays a significant role in Hodge theory, since the Tannakian category of real Hodge structures is equivalent to the category of representations of $\mathbb{S}.$ The real points have a Lie group structure isomorphic to $\Complex^\times$. See Mumford–Tate group.
2. The Weil restriction $\operatorname{Res}_{L/k} \mathbb{G}$ of a (commutative) group variety $\mathbb{G}$ is again a (commutative) group variety of dimension $[L:k]\dim \mathbb{G},$ if L is separable over k.
3. Restriction of scalars on abelian varieties (e.g. elliptic curves) yields abelian varieties, if L is separable over k. James Milne used this to reduce the Birch and Swinnerton-Dyer conjecture for abelian varieties over all number fields to the same conjecture over the rationals.
4. In elliptic curve cryptography, the Weil descent attack uses the Weil restriction to transform a discrete logarithm problem on an elliptic curve over a finite extension field L/K, into a discrete log problem on the Jacobian variety of a hyperelliptic curve over the base field K, that is potentially easier to solve because of K's smaller size.

== Weil restrictions vs. Greenberg transforms ==
Restriction of scalars is similar to the Greenberg transform, but does not generalize it, since the ring of Witt vectors on a commutative algebra A is not in general an A-algebra.
