= Siegel–Weil formula =

Expresses Eisenstein series as a weighted average of theta series of lattices in a genus

In mathematics, the Siegel–Weil formula, introduced by Weil (1964, 1965) as an extension of the results of Siegel (1951, 1952), expresses an Eisenstein series as a weighted average of theta series of lattices in a genus, where the weights are proportional to the inverse of the order of the automorphism group of the lattice. For the constant terms this is essentially the Smith–Minkowski–Siegel mass formula.
