= Weil–Brezin Map =

In mathematics, the Weil–Brezin map, named after André Weil and Jonathan Brezin, is a unitary transformation that maps a Schwartz function on the real line to a smooth function on the Heisenberg manifold. The Weil–Brezin map gives a geometric interpretation of the Fourier transform, the Plancherel theorem and the Poisson summation formula. The image of Gaussian functions under the Weil–Brezin map are nil-theta functions, which are related to theta functions. The Weil–Brezin map is sometimes referred to as the Zak transform, which is widely applied in the field of physics and signal processing; however, the Weil–Brezin Map is defined via Heisenberg group geometrically, whereas there is no direct geometric or group theoretic interpretation from the Zak transform.

== Heisenberg manifold ==
The (continuous) Heisenberg group $N$ is the 3-dimensional Lie group that can be represented by triples of real numbers with multiplication rule

$$\langle x,y,t\rangle \langle a,b,c\rangle = \langle x+a, y+b, t+c+xb\rangle.$$

The discrete Heisenberg group $\Gamma$ is the discrete subgroup of $N$ whose elements are represented by the triples of integers. Considering $\Gamma$ acts on $N$ on the left, the quotient manifold $\Gamma\backslash N$ is called the Heisenberg manifold. The Heisenberg group acts on the Heisenberg manifold on the right. The Haar measure $\mu = dx \wedge dy \wedge dt$ on the Heisenberg group induces a right-translation-invariant measure on the Heisenberg manifold. The space of complex-valued square-integrable functions on the Heisenberg manifold has a right-translation-invariant orthogonal decomposition:

$$L^2(\Gamma\backslash N) = \oplus_{n \in \mathbb{Z}}  H_n$$

where

$$H_n =\{f\in L^2(\Gamma\backslash N)  \mid f(\Gamma \langle x, y, t+s\rangle) = \exp(2\pi i ns) f(\Gamma \langle x,y,t\rangle)\}$$.

== Definition ==
The Weil–Brezin map $W: L^2(\mathbb R) \to H_1$ is the unitary transformation given by

$$W(\psi) (\Gamma \langle x, y, t \rangle) = \sum_{l\in \mathbb Z} \psi(x + l) e^{2 \pi i l y} e^{2\pi i t}$$

for every Schwartz function $\psi$, where convergence is pointwise.

The inverse of the Weil–Brezin map $W^{-1}: H_1 \to L^2(\mathbb R)$ is given by

$$(W^{-1}f) (x) = \int_0^{1} f(\Gamma \langle x, y, 0\rangle) dy$$

for every smooth function $f$ on the Heisenberg manifold that is in $H_1$.

== Fundamental unitary representation of the Heisenberg group ==
For each real number $\lambda\ne 0$, the fundamental unitary representation $U_{\lambda}$ of the Heisenberg group is an irreducible unitary representation of $N$ on $L^2(\mathbb{R})$ defined by

$$(U_{\lambda}(\langle a, b, c \rangle) \psi) (x) =  e^{2 \pi i \lambda (c + bx)} \psi(x +a)$$.

By Stone–von Neumann theorem, this is the unique irreducible representation up to unitary equivalence satisfying the canonical commutation relation

$$U_{\lambda}(\langle a, 0, 0 \rangle) U_{\lambda}(\langle 0, b, 0 \rangle) =e^{2\pi i \lambda ab} U_{\lambda}(\langle 0, b, 0 \rangle) U_{\lambda}(\langle a, 0, 0 \rangle)$$.

The fundamental representation $U=U_1$ of $N$ on $L^2(\mathbb{R})$ and the right translation $R$ of $N$ on $H_1 \subset L^2(\Gamma \backslash N)$ are intertwined by the Weil–Brezin map

$$W U(\langle a, b, c \rangle) = R(\langle a, b, c \rangle) W$$.

In other words, the fundamental representation $U$ on $L^2(\mathbb{R})$ is unitarily equivalent to the right translation $R$ on $H_1$ through the Weil-Brezin map.

== Relation to Fourier transform ==
Let $J: N \to N$ be the automorphism on the Heisenberg group given by

$$J(\langle x, y, t \rangle) =\langle y, -x, t-xy \rangle$$.

It naturally induces a unitary operator $J^* : H_1 \to H_1$, then the Fourier transform

$$\mathcal F = W^{-1} J^{*} W$$

as a unitary operator on $L^2(\mathbb{R})$.

=== Plancherel theorem ===
The norm-preserving property of $W$ and $J^*$, which is easily seen, yields the norm-preserving property of the Fourier transform, which is referred to as the Plancherel theorem.

=== Poisson summation formula ===
For any Schwartz function $\psi$,

$$\sum_l\psi(l) = W(\psi)(\Gamma\langle 0, 0, 0) \rangle) = (J^*W(\psi))(\Gamma\langle 0, 0, 0) \rangle) = W (\hat{\psi})(\Gamma\langle 0, 0, 0) \rangle)=\sum_l \hat{\psi}(l)$$.

This is just the Poisson summation formula.

== Relation to the finite Fourier transform ==
For each $n\ne 0$, the subspace $H_n\subset L^2(\Gamma\backslash N)$ can further be decomposed into right-translation-invariant orthogonal subspaces

$$H_n = \oplus_{m=0}^{|n|-1} H_{n,m}$$

where

$$H_{n,m} =\{f\in H_n \mid f(\Gamma \langle x, y+ {1\over n}, t\rangle) = e^{2\pi i m/n}f(\Gamma \langle x, y, t\rangle)\}$$.

The left translation $L(\langle 0, 1/n, 0\rangle)$ is well-defined on $H_n$, and $H_{n,0}, ... , H_{n, |n|-1}$ are its eigenspaces.

The left translation $L(\langle m/n, 0, 0\rangle)$ is well-defined on $H_n$, and the map

$$L(\langle m/n, 0, 0\rangle) : H_{n,0} \to H_{n,m}$$

is a unitary transformation.

For each $n\ne 0$, and $m = 0, ..., |n|-1$, define the map $W_{n, m}: L^2(\mathbb R) \to H_{n, m}$ by

$$W_{n,m}(\psi) (\Gamma \langle x, y, t \rangle) = \sum_{l\in \mathbb Z} \psi(x + l + {m \over n}) e^{2 \pi i (nl+m) y} e^{2\pi i n t}$$

for every Schwartz function $\psi$, where convergence is pointwise.

$$W_{n,m} =L(\langle m/n, 0, 0\rangle) \circ W_{n,0}.$$

The inverse map $W_{n,m}^{-1}: H_{n,m} \to L^2(\mathbb R)$ is given by

$$(W_{n,m}^{-1}f) (x) = \int_0^{1} e^{-2\pi i m y} f(\Gamma \langle x - {m \over n}, y, 0\rangle) dy$$

for every smooth function $f$ on the Heisenberg manifold that is in $H_{n,m}$.

Similarly, the fundamental unitary representation $U_n$ of the Heisenberg group is unitarily equivalent to the right translation on $H_{n,m}$ through $W_{n,m}$:

$$W_{n,m} U_n(\langle a, b, c \rangle) = R(\langle a, b, c \rangle) W_{n,m}$$.

For any $m, m'$,

$$(W_{n,m'}^{-1}J^* W_{n,m} \psi ) (x) = e^{2\pi i m'm / n} \hat{\psi}(nx)$$.

For each $n>0$, let $\phi_n(x) =(2n)^{1/4} e^{- \pi n x^2 }$. Consider the finite dimensional subspace $K_n$ of $H_n$ generated by $\{\boldsymbol{e}_{n,0}, ..., \boldsymbol{e}_{n,n-1}\}$ where

$$\boldsymbol{e}_{n,m} = W_{n,m} ( \phi_n ) \in H_{n,m}.$$

Then the left translations $L(\langle 1/n, 0, 0\rangle)$ and $L(\langle 0, 1/n, 0\rangle)$ act on $K_n$ and give rise to the irreducible representation of the finite Heisenberg group. The map $J^*$ acts on $K_n$ and gives rise to the finite Fourier transform

$$J^* \boldsymbol{e}_{n,m} = {1 \over \sqrt{n}}\sum_{m'}  e^{2\pi i m'm / n} \boldsymbol{e}_{n,m'}.$$

== Nil-theta functions ==
Nil-theta functions are functions on the Heisenberg manifold that are analogous to the theta functions on the complex plane. The image of Gaussian functions under the Weil–Brezin Map are nil-theta functions. There is a model of the finite Fourier transform defined with nil-theta functions, and the nice property of the model is that the finite Fourier transform is compatible with the algebra structure of the space of nil-theta functions.

=== Definition of nil-theta functions ===
Let $\mathfrak{n}$ be the complexified Lie algebra of the Heisenberg group $N$. A basis of $\mathfrak{n}$ is given by the left-invariant vector fields $X, Y, T$ on $N$:

$$X(x,y,t) = {\partial \over \partial x},$$
$$Y(x,y,t) = {\partial \over \partial y} + x {\partial \over \partial t},$$
$$T(x,y,t) = {\partial \over \partial t}.$$

These vector fields are well-defined on the Heisenberg manifold $\Gamma \backslash N$.

Introduce the notation $V_{-i} = X-i Y$. For each $n>0$, the vector field $V_{-i}$ on the Heisenberg manifold can be thought of as a differential operator on $C^{\infty} (\Gamma \backslash N) \cap H_{n,m}$ with the kernel generated by $\boldsymbol{e}_{n,m}$.

We call

$$\ker(V_{-i}: C^{\infty} (\Gamma \backslash N) \cap H_n \to H_n) = \left\{ \begin{array}{lr} K_n, & n>0 \\ \mathbb{C}, & n=0  \end{array} \right.$$

the space of nil-theta functions of degree $n$.

=== Algebra structure of nil-theta functions ===
The nil-theta functions with pointwise multiplication on $\Gamma \backslash N$ form a graded algebra $\oplus_{n\ge 0} K_n$ (here $K_0 = \mathbb{C}$).

Auslander and Tolimieri showed that this graded algebra is isomorphic to

$$\mathbb{C}[x_1, x_2^2, x_3^3]/(x_3^6 + x_1^4 x_2^2 + x_2^6)$$,

and that the finite Fourier transform (see the preceding section #Relation to the finite Fourier transform) is an automorphism of the graded algebra.

=== Relation to Jacobi theta functions ===
Let $\vartheta(z; \tau) = \sum_{l =-\infty}^\infty \exp (\pi i l^2 \tau + 2 \pi i l z)$ be the Jacobi theta function. Then

$$\vartheta(n(x+iy); ni) = (2n)^{-1/4} e^{\pi n y^2} \boldsymbol{e}_{n,0}(\Gamma\langle y, x, 0 \rangle)$$.

=== Higher order theta functions with characteristics ===
An entire function $f$ on $\mathbb{C}$ is called a theta function of order $n$, period $\tau$ ($\mathrm{Im}(\tau)>0$) and characteristic $[^a_b]$ if it satisfies the following equations:

1. $f(z+1) = \exp(\pi i a ) f(z)$,
2. $f(z+\tau) =\exp(\pi i b) \exp(-\pi i n (2z +\tau)) f(z)$.

The space of theta functions of order $n$, period $\tau$ and characteristic $[^a_b]$ is denoted by $\Theta_n[^a_b](\tau, A)$.

$$\dim \Theta_n[^a_b](\tau, A) =n$$.

A basis of $\Theta_n[^0_0](i, A)$ is

$$\theta_{n,m}(z) = \sum_{l\in \mathbb{Z}} \exp [ -\pi n (l+{m \over n} )^2 + 2 \pi i (l n+ m)  z ) ]$$.

These higher order theta functions are related to the nil-theta functions by

$$\theta_{n,m}(x+ iy) = (2n)^{-1/4} e^{\pi n y^2} \boldsymbol{e}_{n,m} (\Gamma \langle y, x, 0 \rangle )$$.

== See also ==
- Nilmanifold
- Nilpotent group
- Nilpotent Lie algebra
- Weil representation
- Theta representation
- Oscillator representation
