= Hasse–Weil zeta function =

Mathematical function associated to algebraic varieties

In mathematics, the Hasse–Weil zeta function attached to an algebraic variety V defined over an algebraic number field K is a meromorphic function on the complex plane defined in terms of the number of points on the variety after reducing modulo each prime number p. It is a global L-function defined as an Euler product of local zeta functions.

Hasse–Weil L-functions form one of the two major classes of global L-functions, alongside the L-functions associated to automorphic representations. Conjecturally, these two types of global L-functions are actually two descriptions of the same type of global L-function; this would be a vast generalisation of the Taniyama-Weil conjecture, itself an important result in number theory.

For an elliptic curve over a number field K, the Hasse–Weil zeta function is conjecturally related to the group of rational points of the elliptic curve over K by the Birch and Swinnerton-Dyer conjecture.

== Definition ==
The description of the Hasse–Weil zeta function up to finitely many factors of its Euler product is relatively simple. This follows the initial suggestions of Helmut Hasse and André Weil, motivated by the Riemann zeta function, which results from the case when V is a single point.

Taking the case of K the rational number field $\mathbb{Q}$, and V a non-singular projective variety, for almost all prime numbers p the reduction of V modulo p, an algebraic variety V_{p} over the finite field $\mathbb{F}_{p}$ with p elements (defined by reducing modulo p equations for V). Again for almost all p it will be projective and non-singular. We define a Dirichlet series of the complex variable s,

$$Z_{V\!,\mathbb{Q}}(s) = \prod_{p} Z_{V\!,\,p}(p^{-s}),$$

which is the infinite product of the local zeta functions

$$Z_{V\!,\,p}(p^{-s}) = \exp\left(\sum_{k = 1}^\infty \frac{N_k}{k} (p^{-s})^k\right)$$

where N_{k} is the number of points of V defined over the finite field extension $\mathbb{F}_{p^k}$ of $\mathbb{F}_{p}$.

This $Z_{V\!,\mathbb{Q}}(s)$ is well-defined only up to multiplication by rational functions in $p^{-s}$ for finitely many primes p.

Since the indeterminacy is relatively harmless, and has meromorphic continuation everywhere, there is a sense in which the properties of Z(s) do not essentially depend on it. In particular, while the exact form of the functional equation for Z(s), reflecting in a vertical line in the complex plane, will definitely depend on the 'missing' factors, the existence of some such functional equation does not.

A more refined definition became possible with the development of étale cohomology; this neatly explains what to do about the missing, 'bad reduction' factors. According to general principles visible in ramification theory, 'bad' primes carry good information (theory of the conductor). This manifests itself in the étale theory in the Néron–Ogg–Shafarevich criterion for good reduction; namely that there is good reduction, in a definite sense, at all primes p for which the Galois representation ρ on the étale cohomology groups of V is unramified. For those, the definition of local zeta function can be recovered in terms of the characteristic polynomial of

$$\rho(\operatorname{Frob}(p)),$$

Frob(p) being a Frobenius element for p. What happens at the ramified p is that ρ is non-trivial on the inertia group I(p) for p. At those primes the definition must be 'corrected', taking the largest quotient of the representation ρ on which the inertia group acts by the trivial representation. With this refinement, the definition of Z(s) can be upgraded successfully from 'almost all' p to all p participating in the Euler product. The consequences for the functional equation were worked out by Serre and Deligne in the later 1960s; the functional equation itself has not been proved in general.

== Hasse–Weil conjecture ==
The Hasse–Weil conjecture states that the Hasse–Weil zeta function should extend to a meromorphic function for all complex s, and should satisfy a functional equation similar to that of the Riemann zeta function. For elliptic curves over the rational numbers, the Hasse–Weil conjecture follows from the modularity theorem: each elliptic curve E over $\Q$ is modular.

== Birch and Swinnerton-Dyer conjecture ==
The Birch and Swinnerton-Dyer conjecture states that the rank of the abelian group E(K) of points of an elliptic curve E is the order of the zero of the Hasse–Weil L-function L(E, s) at s = 1, and that the first non-zero coefficient in the Taylor expansion of L(E, s) at s = 1 is given by more refined arithmetic data attached to E over K. The conjecture is one of the seven Millennium Prize Problems listed by the Clay Mathematics Institute, which has offered a $1,000,000 prize for the first correct proof.

== Elliptic curves over Q ==
An elliptic curve is a specific type of variety. Let E be an elliptic curve over Q of conductor N. Then, E has good reduction at all primes p not dividing N, it has multiplicative reduction at the primes p that exactly divide N (i.e. such that p divides N, but p^{2} does not; this is written p || N), and it has additive reduction elsewhere (i.e. at the primes where p^{2} divides N). The Hasse–Weil zeta function of E then takes the form

$$Z_{V\!,\mathbb{Q}}(s)= \frac{\zeta(s)\zeta(s-1)}{L(E,s)}. \,$$

Here, ζ(s) is the usual Riemann zeta function and L(E, s) is called the L-function of E/Q, which takes the form

$$L(E,s)=\prod_pL_p(E,s)^{-1} \,$$

where, for a given prime p,

$$L_p(E,s)=\begin{cases}
(1-a_pp^{-s}+p^{1-2s}), & \text{if } p\nmid N \\
(1-a_pp^{-s}), & \text{if }p\mid N \text{ and } p^2 \nmid N \\
1, & \text{if }p^2\mid N
\end{cases}$$

where in the case of good reduction a_{p} is p + 1 − (number of points of E mod p), and in the case of multiplicative reduction a_{p} is ±1 depending on whether E has split (plus sign) or non-split (minus sign) multiplicative reduction at p. A multiplicative reduction of curve E by the prime p is said to be split if -c_{6} is a square in the finite field with p elements.

There is a useful relation not using the conductor:

1. If p doesn't divide $\Delta$ (where $\Delta$ is the discriminant of the elliptic curve) then E has good reduction at p.
2. If p divides $\Delta$ but not $c_4$ then E has multiplicative bad reduction at p.
3. If p divides both $\Delta$ and $c_4$ then E has additive bad reduction at p.

== See also ==
- Arithmetic zeta function

== Bibliography ==
- J.-P. Serre, Facteurs locaux des fonctions zêta des variétés algébriques (définitions et conjectures), 1969/1970, Sém. Delange–Pisot–Poitou, exposé 19
