= Weil algebra =

The term "Weil algebra" is also sometimes used to mean a finite-dimensional real local Artinian ring.

In mathematics, the Weil algebra of a Lie algebra g, introduced by Cartan (1951) based on unpublished work of André Weil, is a differential graded algebra given by the Koszul algebra Λ(g*)⊗S(g*) of its dual g*.
