= Tamagawa number =

Mathematical concept

In mathematics, the Tamagawa number $\tau(G)$ of a semisimple algebraic group defined over a global field k is the measure of $G(\mathbb{A})/G(k)$, where $\mathbb{A}$ is the adele ring of k. Tamagawa numbers were introduced by Tamagawa (1966), and named after him by Weil (1959).

Tsuneo Tamagawa's observation was that, starting from an invariant differential form ω on G, defined over k, the measure involved was well-defined: while ω could be replaced by cω with c a non-zero element of $k$, the product formula for valuations in k is reflected by the independence from c of the measure of the quotient, for the product measure constructed from ω on each effective factor. The computation of Tamagawa numbers for semisimple groups contains important parts of classical quadratic form theory.

== Definition ==
Let k be a global field, A its ring of adeles, and G a semisimple algebraic group defined over k.

Choose Haar measures on the completions k_{v} of k such that O_{v} has volume 1 for all but finitely many places v. These then induce a Haar measure on A, which we further assume is normalized so that A/k has volume 1 with respect to the induced quotient measure.

The Tamagawa measure on the adelic algebraic group G(A) is now defined as follows. Take a left-invariant n-form ω on G(k) defined over k, where n is the dimension of G. This, together with the above choices of Haar measure on the k_{v}, induces Haar measures on G(k_{v}) for all places of v. As G is semisimple, the product of these measures yields a Haar measure on G(A), called the Tamagawa measure. The Tamagawa measure does not depend on the choice of ω, nor on the choice of measures on the k_{v}, because multiplying ω by an element of k* multiplies the Haar measure on G(A) by 1, using the product formula for valuations.

The Tamagawa number τ(G) is defined to be the Tamagawa measure of G(A)/G(k).

== Weil's conjecture on Tamagawa numbers ==
Weil's conjecture on Tamagawa numbers states that the Tamagawa number τ(G) of a simply connected (i.e. not having a proper algebraic covering) simple algebraic group defined over a number field is 1. Weil (1959) calculated the Tamagawa number in many cases of classical groups and observed that it is an integer in all considered cases and that it was equal to 1 in the cases when the group is simply connected. Ono (1963) found examples where the Tamagawa numbers are not integers, but the conjecture about the Tamagawa number of simply connected groups was proven in general by several works culminating in a paper by Kottwitz (1988) and for the analogue over function fields over finite fields by Gaitsgory & Lurie (2019).

== See also ==
- Adelic algebraic group
