= Weil's criterion =

In mathematics, Weil's criterion is a criterion of André Weil for the Generalized Riemann hypothesis to be true. It takes the form of an equivalent statement, to the effect that a certain generalized function is positive definite.

Weil's idea was formulated first in a 1952 paper. It is based on the explicit formulae of prime number theory, as they apply to Dirichlet L-functions, and other more general global L-functions. A single statement thus combines statements on the complex zeroes of all Dirichlet L-functions.

Weil returned to this idea in a 1972 paper, showing how the formulation extended to a larger class of L-functions (Artin-Hecke L-functions); and to the global function field case. Here the inclusion of Artin L-functions, in particular, implicates Artin's conjecture; so that the criterion involves a Generalized Riemann Hypothesis plus Artin Conjecture.

The case of function fields, of curves over finite fields, is one in which the analogue of the Riemann Hypothesis is known, by Weil's classical work begun in 1940; and Weil also proved the analogue of the Artin Conjecture. Therefore, in that setting, the criterion can be used to show the corresponding statement of positive-definiteness does hold.

== See also ==
- Li's criterion
