= Hasse's theorem on elliptic curves =

Estimates the number of points on an elliptic curve over a finite field

In mathematics, Hasse's theorem on elliptic curves, also referred to as the Hasse bound, provides an estimate of the number of points on an elliptic curve over a finite field.

Formally, the theorem states that if $N$ is the number of points on the elliptic curve $E$ over a finite field with $q$ elements, then

$$|N - (q+1)| \le 2 \sqrt{q}.$$

The reason is that $N$ differs from $q + 1$, the number of points of the projective line over the same field, by an "error term" that is the sum of two complex numbers, each of absolute value $\sqrt{q}$.

This result had originally been conjectured by Emil Artin in his thesis. It was proven by Helmut Hasse in 1933, with the proof published in a series of papers in 1936.

Hasse's theorem is equivalent to the determination of the absolute value of the roots of the local zeta-function of $E$. In this form it can be seen to be the analogue of the Riemann hypothesis for the function field associated with the elliptic curve.

== Hasse–Weil Bound ==
A generalization of the Hasse bound to higher genus algebraic curves is the Hasse–Weil bound. This provides a bound on the number of points on a curve over a finite field. If the number of points on the curve $C$ of genus $g$ over the finite field $\mathbb{F}_q$ is $\#C(\mathbb{F}_q)$, then

$$|\#C(\mathbb{F}_q) - (q+1)| \le 2g \sqrt{q}.$$

This result is again equivalent to the determination of the absolute value of the roots of the local zeta-function of $C$, and is the analogue of the Riemann hypothesis for the function field associated with the curve.

The Hasse–Weil bound reduces to the usual Hasse bound when applied to elliptic curves, which have genus $g=1$.

The Hasse–Weil bound is a consequence of the Weil conjectures, originally proposed by André Weil in 1949 and proved by André Weil in the case of curves.

== See also ==
- Sato–Tate conjecture
- Schoof's algorithm
- Weil's bound
