= André Weil =

French mathematician (1906-1998)

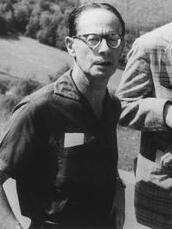
- Weil in 1968
- Born: 6 May 1906; Paris, France
- Died: 6 August 1998 (aged 92); Princeton, New Jersey, U.S.
- Education: University of Paris; École Normale Supérieure
- Known for: List: Bergman–Weil formula; Borel–Weil theorem; Chern–Weil homomorphism; Chern–Weil theory; De Rham–Weil theorem; Weil's explicit formula; Hasse–Weil Bound; Hasse–Weil zeta function; Hasse–Weil L-function; Mordell–Weil group; Mordell–Weil theorem; Oka–Weil theorem; Siegel–Weil formula; Shafarevich–Weil theorem; Taniyama–Shimura–Weil conjecture; Weil algebra; Weil–Brezin Map; Weil–Châtelet group; Weil cohomology; Weil conjectures; Weil conjecture on Tamagawa numbers; Weil's criterion; Weil–Deligne group scheme; Weil distribution; Weil divisor; Weil group; Weil height; Weil number; Weil pairing; Weil–Petersson metric; Weil reciprocity law; Weil representation; Weil restriction
- Awards: Wolf Prize (1979); Leroy P. Steele Prize (1980); Barnard Medal for Meritorious Service to Science (1980); Kyoto Prize (1994); ForMemRS (1966)
- Scientific career
- Fields: Mathematics
- Workplaces: Lehigh University; Universidade de São Paulo (1945–47); University of Chicago (1947–58); Institute for Advanced Study
- Doctoral advisor: Jacques Hadamard; Charles Émile Picard
- Doctoral students: Pierre Cartier; Harley Flanders; William A. Howard; Teruhisa Matsusaka; Peter Swinnerton-Dyer; Alexandre Augusto Martins Rodrigues

André Weil (/veɪ/; French: [ɑ̃dʁe vɛj]; 6 May 1906 – 6 August 1998) was a French mathematician, known for his foundational work in number theory and algebraic geometry. He was one of the most influential mathematicians of the twentieth century. His influence is due both to his original contributions to a remarkably broad spectrum of mathematical theories, and to the mark he left on mathematical practice and style, through some of his own works as well as through the Bourbaki group, of which he was one of the principal founders.

== Life ==
Weil's father was Bernard Weil (1872–1955), a medical doctor from an agnostic Alsatian Jewish background, who moved to Paris after the German annexation of Alsace–Lorraine. Weil's mother was Salomea "Selma" Reinherz (1879–1965), who was born into a Jewish family in Rostov-on-Don and raised in Belgium. According to Osmo Pekonen, "the family name Weil came to be when many Levis in the Napoleonic era changed their names this way, by anagram."

Weil was born in his parents' apartment in Paris on 6 May 1906. His younger sister and only sibling, Simone Weil, would later become a famous philosopher. The family was fairly affluent, and the children were raised in an attentive, supportive atmosphere.

Weil studied in Paris, Rome, and Göttingen and received his doctorate in 1928. While in Germany, he befriended Carl Ludwig Siegel. Starting in 1930, he spent two academic years at Aligarh Muslim University in India. Aside from mathematics, Weil held lifelong interests in classical Greek and Latin literature, Hinduism, and Sanskrit literature: he had taught himself Sanskrit in 1920 at age 14. After teaching for one year at Aix-Marseille University, he taught for six years at University of Strasbourg. In 1937 he married Éveline de Possel (née Éveline Gillet), who had previously been married to his colleague René de Possel.

Weil was in Finland when World War II broke out; he had been travelling in Scandinavia since April 1939. His wife Éveline returned to France without him. Weil was arrested in Finland at the outbreak of the Winter War on suspicion of spying; however, accounts of his life having been in danger were shown to be exaggerated. Weil returned to France via Sweden and the United Kingdom and was detained at Le Havre in January 1940. He was charged with failure to report for duty, and was imprisoned in Le Havre and then Rouen. While Weil was in the military prison in Bonne-Nouvelle, a district of Rouen, from February to May, he completed the work that made his reputation. He was tried on 3 May 1940. Sentenced to five years, he requested to be attached to a military unit instead, and was given the chance to join a regiment in Cherbourg. After the fall of France in June 1940, he met up with his family in Marseille, where he arrived by sea. He then went to Clermont-Ferrand, where he managed to join his wife, Éveline, who had been living in German-occupied France.

In January 1941, Weil and his family sailed from Marseille to New York. He spent the remainder of the war in the United States, where he was supported by the Rockefeller Foundation and the Guggenheim Foundation. For two years, he taught undergraduate mathematics at Lehigh University, where he was unappreciated, overworked, and poorly paid, although he did not have to worry about being drafted, unlike his American students. He quit the job at Lehigh and moved to Brazil, where he taught at the Universidade de São Paulo from 1945 to 1947, working with Oscar Zariski. Weil and his wife had two daughters, Sylvie (born in 1942) and Nicolette (born in 1946). He had 3 grandchildren, Maia Tellier, Jessica Schwartzman, and Nicolas Sayre.

He then returned to the United States and taught at the University of Chicago from 1947 to 1958, before moving to the Institute for Advanced Study, where he would spend the remainder of his career. He was a Plenary Speaker at the ICM in 1950 in Cambridge, Massachusetts, in 1954 in Amsterdam, and in 1978 in Helsinki. Weil was elected Foreign Member of the Royal Society in 1966. In 1979, he shared the second Wolf Prize in Mathematics with Jean Leray.

== Work ==
Weil made substantial contributions in a number of areas, the most important being his discovery of profound connections between algebraic geometry and number theory. This began in his doctoral work leading to the Mordell–Weil theorem (1928, and shortly applied in Siegel's theorem on integral points). Mordell's theorem had an ad hoc proof; Weil began the separation of the infinite descent argument into two types of structural approach, by means of height functions for sizing rational points, and by means of Galois cohomology, which would not be categorized as such for another two decades. Both aspects of Weil's work have steadily developed into substantial theories.

Among his major accomplishments were the 1940s proof of the Riemann hypothesis for zeta-functions of curves over finite fields, and his subsequent laying of proper foundations for algebraic geometry to support that result (from 1942 to 1946, most intensively). The so-called Weil conjectures were hugely influential from around 1950; these statements were later proved by Bernard Dwork, Alexander Grothendieck, Michael Artin, and finally by Pierre Deligne, who completed the most difficult step in 1973.

Weil introduced the adele ring in the late 1930s, following Claude Chevalley's lead with the ideles, and gave a proof of the Riemann–Roch theorem with them (a version appeared in his Basic Number Theory in 1967). His 'matrix divisor' (vector bundle avant la lettre) Riemann–Roch theorem from 1938 was a very early anticipation of later ideas such as moduli spaces of bundles. The Weil conjecture on Tamagawa numbers proved resistant for many years. Eventually the adelic approach became basic in automorphic representation theory. He picked up another credited Weil conjecture, around 1967, which later under pressure from Serge Lang (resp. of Jean-Pierre Serre) became known as the Taniyama–Shimura conjecture (resp. Taniyama–Weil conjecture) based on a roughly formulated question of Taniyama at the 1955 Nikkō conference. His attitude towards conjectures was that one should not dignify a guess as a conjecture lightly, and in the Taniyama case, the evidence was only there after extensive computational work carried out from the late 1960s.

Other significant results were on Pontryagin duality and differential geometry. He introduced the concept of a uniform space in general topology, as a by-product of his collaboration with Nicolas Bourbaki (of which he was a Founding Father). His work on sheaf theory hardly appears in his published papers, but correspondence with Henri Cartan in the late 1940s, and reprinted in his collected papers, proved most influential. He also chose the symbol ∅, derived from the letter Ø in the Norwegian alphabet (which he alone among the Bourbaki group was familiar with), to represent the empty set.

Weil also made a well-known contribution in Riemannian geometry in his very first paper in 1926, when he showed that the classical isoperimetric inequality holds on non-positively curved surfaces. This established the 2-dimensional case of what later became known as the Cartan–Hadamard conjecture.

He discovered that the so-called Weil representation, previously introduced in quantum mechanics by Irving Segal and David Shale, gave a contemporary framework for understanding the classical theory of quadratic forms. This was also a beginning of a substantial development by others, connecting representation theory and theta functions.

Weil was a member of both the National Academy of Sciences and the American Philosophical Society.

== As expositor ==
Weil's ideas made an important contribution to the writings and seminars of Bourbaki, before and after World War II. He also wrote several books on the history of number theory.

== Beliefs ==
Hindu thought had great influence on Weil. He was an agnostic, and he respected religions.

== Legacy ==
Asteroid 289085 Andreweil, discovered by astronomers at the Saint-Sulpice Observatory in 2004, was named in his memory. The official naming citation was published by the Minor Planet Center on 14 February 2014 (M.P.C. 87143).

== Books ==
Mathematical works:

- Arithmétique et géométrie sur les variétés algébriques (1935)
- Sur les espaces à structure uniforme et sur la topologie générale (1937)
- L'intégration dans les groupes topologiques et ses applications (1940)
- Weil, André (1946). Foundations of Algebraic Geometry. American Mathematical Society Colloquium Publications, vol. 29. Providence, R.I.: American Mathematical Society. MR 0023093. ISBN 978-0-8218-1029-3.
- Sur les courbes algébriques et les variétés qui s'en déduisent (1948)
- Variétés abéliennes et courbes algébriques (1948)
- Introduction à l'étude des variétés kählériennes (1958)
- Discontinuous subgroups of classical groups (1958) Chicago lecture notes
- Weil, André (1967), Basic number theory., volume=144, Springer-Verlag New York, Inc., New York, ISBN 3-540-58655-5, MR 0234930
- Dirichlet Series and Automorphic Forms, Lezioni Fermiane (1971) Lecture Notes in Mathematics, vol. 189
- Essais historiques sur la théorie des nombres (1975)
- Elliptic Functions According to Eisenstein and Kronecker (1976)
- Number Theory for Beginners (1979) with Maxwell Rosenlicht
- Adeles and Algebraic Groups (1982)
- Number Theory: An Approach Through History From Hammurapi to Legendre (1984)

Collected papers:

- Œuvres Scientifiques, Collected Works, three volumes (1979)
- Weil, André (March 2009). Œuvres Scientifiques / Collected Papers. Springer Collected Works in Mathematics (in English, French, and German). Vol. 1 (1926–1951) (2nd printing ed.). Springer. ISBN 978-3-540-85888-1.
- Weil, André (March 2009). Œuvres Scientifiques / Collected Papers. Springer Collected Works in Mathematics (in English, French, and German). Vol. 2 (1951-1964) (2nd printing ed.). Springer. ISBN 978-3-540-87735-6.
- Weil, André (March 2009). Œuvres Scientifiques / Collected Papers. Springer Collected Works in Mathematics (in English, French, and German). Vol. 3 (1964-1978) (2nd printing ed.). Springer. ISBN 978-3-540-87737-0.

Autobiography:

- French: Souvenirs d'Apprentissage (1991) ISBN 3-7643-2500-3. Review in English by J. E. Cremona.
- English translation: The Apprenticeship of a Mathematician (1992), ISBN 0-8176-2650-6 Reviews by Veeravalli S. Varadarajan and by Saunders Mac Lane.

Memoir by his daughter:

- At Home with André and Simone Weil by Sylvie Weil, translated by Benjamin Ivry; ISBN 978-0-8101-2704-3, Northwestern University Press, 2010.

== See also ==
- List of things named after André Weil
