= Weil conjectures =

On generating functions from counting points on algebraic varieties over finite fields

In mathematics, the Weil conjectures were highly influential proposals by André Weil (1949). They led to a successful multi-decade program to prove them, in which many leading researchers developed the framework of modern algebraic geometry and number theory.

The conjectures concern the generating functions (known as local zeta functions) derived from counting points on algebraic varieties over finite fields. A variety V over a finite field with q elements has a finite number of rational points (with coordinates in the original field), as well as points with coordinates in any finite extension of the original field. The generating function has coefficients derived from the numbers N_{k} of points over the extension field with q^{k} elements.

Weil conjectured that such zeta functions for smooth varieties are rational functions, satisfy a certain functional equation, and have their zeros in restricted places. The last two parts were consciously modelled on the Riemann zeta function, a kind of generating function for prime integers, which obeys a functional equation and (conjecturally) has its zeros restricted by the Riemann hypothesis. The rationality was proved by Bernard Dwork (1960), the functional equation by Alexander Grothendieck (1965), and the analogue of the Riemann hypothesis by Pierre Deligne (1974).

== Background and history ==
The earliest antecedent of the Weil conjectures is by Carl Friedrich Gauss and appears in section VII of his Disquisitiones Arithmeticae (Mazur 1974), concerned with roots of unity and Gaussian periods. In article 358, he moves on from the periods that build up towers of quadratic extensions, for the construction of regular polygons; and assumes that p is a prime number congruent to 1 modulo 3. Then there is a cyclic cubic field inside the cyclotomic field of pth roots of unity, and a normal integral basis of periods for the integers of this field (an instance of the Hilbert–Speiser theorem). Gauss constructs the order-3 periods, corresponding to the cyclic group (Z/pZ)^{×} of non-zero residues modulo p under multiplication and its unique subgroup of index three. Gauss lets $\mathfrak{R}$, $\mathfrak{R}'$, and $\mathfrak{R}''$ be its cosets. Taking the periods (sums of roots of unity) corresponding to these cosets applied to exp(2πi/p), he notes that these periods have a multiplication table that is accessible to calculation. Products are linear combinations of the periods, and he determines the coefficients. He sets, for example, $(\mathfrak{R}\mathfrak{R})$ equal to the number of elements of Z/pZ which are in $\mathfrak{R}$ and which, after being increased by one, are also in $\mathfrak{R}$. He proves that this number and related ones are the coefficients of the products of the periods. To see the relation of these sets to the Weil conjectures, notice that if α and α + 1 are both in $\mathfrak{R}$, then there exist x and y in Z/pZ such that x^{3} = α and y^{3} = α + 1; consequently, x^{3} + 1 = y^{3}. Therefore $(\mathfrak{R}\mathfrak{R})$ is related to the number of solutions to x^{3} + 1 = y^{3} in the finite field Z/pZ. The other coefficients have similar interpretations. Gauss's determination of the coefficients of the products of the periods therefore counts the number of points on these elliptic curves, and as a byproduct he proves the analog of the Riemann hypothesis.

The Weil conjectures in the special case of algebraic curves were conjectured by Emil Artin (1924). The case of curves over finite fields was proved by Weil, finishing the project started by Hasse's theorem on elliptic curves over finite fields. Their interest was obvious enough from within number theory: they implied upper bounds for exponential sums, a basic concern in analytic number theory (Moreno 2001).

What was really eye-catching, from the point of view of other mathematical areas, was the proposed connection with algebraic topology. Given that finite fields are discrete in nature, and topology speaks only about the continuous, the detailed formulation of Weil (based on working out some examples) was striking and novel. It suggested that geometry over finite fields should fit into well-known patterns relating to Betti numbers, the Lefschetz fixed-point theorem and so on.

The analogy with topology suggested that a new homological theory be set up applying within algebraic geometry. This took two decades (it was a central aim of the work and school of Alexander Grothendieck) building up on initial suggestions from Serre. The rationality part of the conjectures was proved first by Bernard Dwork (1960), using p-adic methods. Grothendieck (1965) and his collaborators established the rationality conjecture, the functional equation and the link to Betti numbers by using the properties of étale cohomology, a new cohomology theory developed by Grothendieck and Michael Artin for attacking the Weil conjectures, as outlined in Grothendieck (1960). Of the four conjectures, the analogue of the Riemann hypothesis was the hardest to prove. Motivated by the proof of Serre (1960) of an analogue of the Weil conjectures for Kähler manifolds, Grothendieck envisioned a proof based on his standard conjectures on algebraic cycles (Kleiman 1968). However, Grothendieck's standard conjectures remain open (except for the hard Lefschetz theorem, which was proved by Deligne by extending his work on the Weil conjectures), and the analogue of the Riemann hypothesis was proved by Deligne (1974), using the étale cohomology theory but circumventing the use of standard conjectures by an ingenious argument.

Deligne (1980) found and proved a generalization of the Weil conjectures, bounding the weights of the pushforward of a sheaf.

== Statement of the Weil conjectures ==
Suppose that X is a non-singular n-dimensional projective algebraic variety over the field F_{q} with q elements. The zeta function ζ(X, s) of X is by definition

$$\zeta(X, s) = \exp\left(\sum_{m = 1}^\infty \frac{N_m}{m} q^{-ms}\right)$$

where N_{m} is the number of points of X defined over the degree m extension F_{q^{m}} of F_{q}.

The Weil conjectures state:

1. (Rationality) ζ(X, s) is a rational function of T = q^{−s}. More precisely, ζ(X, s) can be written as a finite alternating product

$$\prod_{i=0}^{2n} P_i(q^{-s})^{(-1)^{i+1}} = \frac{P_1(T)\dotsb P_{2n-1}(T)}{P_0(T)\dotsb P_{2n}(T)},$$

where each P_{i}(T) is an integral polynomial. Furthermore, P_{0}(T) = 1 − T, P_{2n}(T) = 1 − q^{n}T, and for 1 ≤ i ≤ 2n − 1, P_{i}(T) factors over C as $\textstyle\prod_j (1 - \alpha_{ij}T)$ for some numbers α_{ij}.

2. (Functional equation and Poincaré duality) The zeta function satisfies

$$\zeta(X,n-s)=\pm q^{nE/2-Es}\zeta(X,s)$$

or equivalently

$$\zeta(X,q^{-n}T^{-1})=\pm q^{nE/2}T^E\zeta(X,T)$$

where E is the Euler characteristic of X. In particular, for each i, the numbers α_{2n−i,1}, α_{2n−i,2}, ... equal the numbers q^{n}/α_{i,1}, q^{n}/α_{i,2}, ... in some order.

3. (Riemann hypothesis) |α_{i,j}| = q^{i/2} for all 1 ≤ i ≤ 2n − 1 and all j. This implies that all zeros of P_{k}(T) lie on the "critical line" of complex numbers s with real part k/2.
4. (Betti numbers) If X is a (good) "reduction mod p" of a non-singular projective variety Y defined over a number field embedded in the field of complex numbers, then the degree of P_{i} is the i^{th} Betti number of the space of complex points of Y.

== Examples ==
=== The projective line ===
The simplest example (other than a point) is to take X to be the projective line. The number of points of X over a field with q^{m} elements is just N_{m} = q^{m} + 1 (where the "+ 1" comes from the "point at infinity"). The zeta function is just

$$\frac{1}{(1-q^{-s})(1-q^{1-s})}.$$

It is easy to check all parts of the Weil conjectures directly. For example, the corresponding complex variety is the Riemann sphere and its initial Betti numbers are 1, 0, 1.

=== Projective space ===
It is not much harder to do n-dimensional projective space. The number of points of X over a field with q^{m} elements is just N_{m} = 1 + q^{m} + q^{2m} + ⋯ + q^{nm}. The zeta function is just

$$\frac{1}{(1-q^{-s})(1-q^{1-s})\dots(1-q^{n-s})}.$$

It is again easy to check all parts of the Weil conjectures directly. (Complex projective space gives the relevant Betti numbers, which nearly determine the answer.)

The number of points on the projective line and projective space are so easy to calculate because they can be written as disjoint unions of a finite number of copies of affine spaces. It is also easy to prove the Weil conjectures for other spaces, such as Grassmannians and flag varieties, which have the same "paving" property.

=== Elliptic curves ===
These give the first non-trivial cases of the Weil conjectures (proved by Hasse). If E is an elliptic curve over a finite field with q elements, then the number of points of E defined over the field with q^{m} elements is 1 − α^{m} − β^{m} + q^{m}, where α and β are complex conjugates with absolute value √q. The zeta function is

$$\frac{(1-\alpha q^{-s})(1-\beta q^{-s})}{(1-q^{-s})(1-q^{1-s})}.$$

The Betti numbers are given by the torus, 1,2,1, and the numerator is a quadratic.

=== Hyperelliptic curves ===
As an example, consider the hyperelliptic curve

$$C: y^2 + y = x^5,$$

which is of genus $g=2$ and dimension $n=1$. At first viewed as a curve $C/\mathbb{Q}$ defined over the rational numbers $\mathbb{Q}$, this curve has good reduction at all primes $5\ne q\in\mathbb{P}$. So, after reduction modulo $q\ne 5$, one obtains a hyperelliptic curve $C/{\bf F}_q: y^2 + h(x)y=f(x)$ of genus 2, with $h(x)=1, f(x)=x^5\in {\bf F}_q[x]$. Taking $q=41$ as an example, the Weil polynomials $P_i(T)$, $i=0,1,2,$ and the zeta function of $C/{\bf F}_{41}$ assume the form

$$\zeta(C/{\bf F}_{41}, s)=\frac{P_1(T)}{P_0(T)\cdot P_2(T)}=\frac{1 - 9\cdot T + 71\cdot T^2 - 9\cdot 41\cdot T^3 + 41^2\cdot T^4}{(1-T)(1-41\cdot T)}.$$

The values $c_1=-9$ and $c_2=71$ can be determined by counting the numbers of solutions $(x,y)$ of $y^2 + y=x^5$ over ${\bf F}_{41}$ and ${\bf F}_{41^2}$, respectively, and adding 1 to each of these two numbers to allow for the point at infinity $\infty$. This counting yields $N_1=33$ and $N_2=1743$. It follows:

$c_1=N_1-1-q=33-1-41=-9$ and
$$c_2=(N_2-1-q^2+c_1^2)/2=(1743-1-41^2+(-9)^2)/2=71.$$

The zeros of $P_1(T)$ are $z_1:=0.12305+\sqrt{-1}\cdot 0.09617$ and $z_2:=-0.01329+\sqrt{-1}\cdot 0.15560$ (the decimal expansions of these real and imaginary parts are cut off after the fifth decimal place) together with their complex conjugates $z_3:=\bar z_1$ and $z_4:=\bar z_2$. So, in the factorisation $P_1(T)=\prod_{j=1}^4 (1-\alpha_{1,j} T)$, we have $\alpha_{1,j}=1/z_j$ . As stated in the third part (Riemann hypothesis) of the Weil conjectures, $|\alpha_{1,j}|=\sqrt{41}$ for $j=1,2,3,4$.

The non-singular, projective, complex manifold that belongs to $C/\mathbb{Q}$ has the Betti numbers $B_0=1, B_1=2g=4, B_2=1$. As described in part four of the Weil conjectures, the (topologically defined!) Betti numbers coincide with the degrees of the Weil polynomials $P_i(T)$, for all primes $q\ne 5$: ${\rm deg}(P_i)=B_i,\,i=0,1,2$.

=== Abelian surfaces ===
An Abelian surface is a two-dimensional Abelian variety. This is, they are projective varieties that also have the structure of a group, in a way that is compatible with the group composition and taking inverses. Elliptic curves represent one-dimensional Abelian varieties. As an example of an Abelian surface defined over a finite field, consider the Jacobian variety $X:=\text{Jac}(C/{\bf F}_{41})$ of the genus 2 curve

$$C/{\bf F}_{41}: y^2 + y=x^5,$$

which was introduced in the section on hyperelliptic curves. The dimension of $X$ equals the genus of $C$, so $n=2$. There are algebraic integers $\alpha_1,\ldots,\alpha_4$ such that

1. the polynomial $P(x)=\prod_{j=1}^4 (x-\alpha_j)$ has coefficients in $\mathbb{Z}$;
2. $M_m:=|\text{Jac}(C/{\bf F}_{41^m})|=\prod_{j=1}^4 (1-\alpha_j^m)$ for all $m\in\mathbb{N}$; and
3. $|\alpha_j|=\sqrt{41}$ for $j=1,\ldots,4$.

The zeta-function of $X$ is given by

$$\zeta(X,s)=\prod_{i=0}^{4} P_i(q^{-s})^{(-1)^{i+1}} = \frac{P_1(T)\cdot P_3(T)}{P_0(T)\cdot P_2(T)\cdot P_{4}(T)},$$

where $q=41$, $T=q^{-s}\,\stackrel{\rm def}{=}\,\text{exp}(-s\cdot\text{log}(41))$, and $s$ represents the complex variable of the zeta-function. The Weil polynomials $P_i(T)$ have the following specific form (Kahn 2020):

$$P_i(T)=\prod_{1 \leq j_1<j_2<\ldots<j_{i-1}<j_i \leq 4} (1-\alpha_{j_1}\cdot\ldots\cdot\alpha_{j_i}T)$$

for $i=0,1,\ldots,4$, and

$$P_1(T)=\prod_{j=1}^{4} (1-\alpha_{j} T)=1 - 9\cdot T + 71\cdot T^2 - 9\cdot 41\cdot T^3 + 41^2\cdot T^4$$

is the same for the curve $C$ (see section above) and its Jacobian variety $X$. This is, the inverse roots of $P_i(T)$ are the products $\alpha_{j_1}\cdot\ldots\cdot\alpha_{j_i}$ that consist of $i$ many, different inverse roots of $P_1(T)$. Hence, all coefficients of the polynomials $P_i(T)$ can be expressed as polynomial functions of the parameters $c_1=-9$, $c_2=71$ and $q=41$ appearing in $P_1(T)=1+c_1 T + c_2 T^2 + q c_1 T^3 + q^2 T^4.$ Calculating these polynomial functions for the coefficients of the $P_i(T)$ shows that

$$\begin{alignat}{2}
P_0(T) &= 1 - T\\
P_1(T) &= 1 - 3^2\cdot T + 71\cdot T^2 - 3^2\cdot 41\cdot T^3 + 41^2\cdot T^4\\
P_2(T) &=(1 - 41\cdot T)^2 \cdot (1 + 11\cdot T + 3\cdot 7\cdot 41\cdot T^2 + 11\cdot 41^2\cdot T^3 + 41^4\cdot T^4)\\
P_3(T) &=1 - 3^2\cdot 41\cdot T + 71\cdot 41^2\cdot T^2 - 3^2\cdot 41^4\cdot T^3 + 41^6\cdot T^4\\
P_4(T) &=1 - 41^2\cdot T
\end{alignat}$$

Polynomial $P_1$ allows for calculating the numbers of elements of the Jacobian variety $\text{Jac}(C)$ over the finite field ${\bf F}_{41}$ and its field extension ${\bf F}_{41^2}$:

$$\begin{alignat}{2}
M_1 &\;\overset{\underset{\mathrm{def}}{}}{=}\; |\text{Jac}(C/{\bf F}_{41})|=P_1(1)=\prod_{j=1}^4 [1-\alpha_j T]_{T=1}\\
&= [1 - 9\cdot T + 71\cdot T^2 - 9\cdot 41\cdot T^3 + 41^2\cdot T^4]_{T=1} =
1 - 9 + 71 - 9\cdot 41 + 41^2=1375=5^3\cdot 11\text{, and}\\
M_2 &\;\overset{\underset{\mathrm{def}}{}}{=}\; |\text{Jac}(C/{\bf F}_{41^2})|=\prod_{j=1}^4 [1-\alpha_j^2 T]_{T=1}\\
&= [1 + 61\cdot T + 3\cdot 587\cdot T^2 + 61\cdot 41^2\cdot T^3 + 41^4\cdot T^4]_{T=1} = 2930125 = 5^3\cdot 11\cdot 2131.
\end{alignat}$$

The inverses $\alpha_{i,j}$ of the zeros of $P_i(T)$ do have the expected absolute value of $41^{i/2}$ (Riemann hypothesis). Moreover, the maps $\alpha_{i,j}\longmapsto 41^2/\alpha_{i,j},$ $j=1,\ldots,\deg P_i,$ correlate the inverses of the zeros of $P_i(T)$ and the inverses of the zeros of $P_{4-i}(T)$. A non-singular, complex, projective, algebraic variety $Y$ with good reduction at the prime 41 to $X=\text{Jac}(C/{\bf F}_{41})$ must have Betti numbers $B_0=B_4=1, B_1=B_3=4, B_2=6$, since these are the degrees of the polynomials $P_i(T).$ The Euler characteristic $E$ of $X$ is given by the alternating sum of these degrees/Betti numbers: $E=1-4+6-4+1=0$.

By taking the logarithm of

$$\zeta(\text{Jac}(C/{\bf F}_{41}), s)\,=\,
\exp\left(\sum_{m = 1}^\infty \frac{M_m}{m} (41^{-s})^m\right)\,=\,\prod_{i=0}^{4} \, P_i (41^{-s})^{(-1)^{i+1}} =\frac{P_1(T)\cdot P_3(T)}{P_0(T)\cdot P_2(T)\cdot P_4(T)},$$

it follows that

$$\begin{alignat}{2}
\sum_{m = 1}^\infty & \frac{M_m}{m} (41^{-s})^m\,=\,\log\left(\frac{P_1(T)\cdot P_3(T)}{P_0(T)\cdot P_2(T)\cdot P_4(T)}\right)\\
&=1375\cdot T + 2930125/2\cdot T^2 + 4755796375/3\cdot T^3 + 7984359145125/4 \cdot T^4 + 13426146538750000/5\cdot T^5 + O(T^6).
\end{alignat}$$

Aside from the values $M_1$ and $M_2$ already known, you can read off from this Taylor series all other numbers $M_m$, $m\in\mathbb{N}$, of ${\bf F}_{41^m}$-rational elements of the Jacobian variety, defined over ${\bf F}_{41}$, of the curve $C/{\bf F}_{41}$: for instance, $M_3=4755796375=5^3\cdot 11\cdot 61\cdot 56701$ and $M_4=7984359145125=3^4\cdot 5^3\cdot 11\cdot 2131\cdot 33641$. In doing so, $m_1|m_2$ always implies $M_{m_1}|M_{m_2}$ since then, $\text{Jac}(C/{\bf F}_{41^{m_1}})$ is a subgroup of $\text{Jac}(C/{\bf F}_{41^{m_2}})$.

== Weil cohomology ==
Weil suggested that the conjectures would follow from the existence of a suitable "Weil cohomology theory" for varieties over finite fields, similar to the usual cohomology with rational coefficients for complex varieties. His idea was that if F is the Frobenius automorphism over the finite field, then the number of points of the variety X over the field of order q^{m} is the number of fixed points of F^{m} (acting on all points of the variety X defined over the algebraic closure). In algebraic topology the number of fixed points of an automorphism can be worked out using the Lefschetz fixed-point theorem, given as an alternating sum of traces on the cohomology groups. So if there were similar cohomology groups for varieties over finite fields, then the zeta function could be expressed in terms of them.

The first problem with this is that the coefficient field for a Weil cohomology theory cannot be the rational numbers. To see this consider the case of a supersingular elliptic curve over a finite field of characteristic p. The endomorphism ring of this is an order in a quaternion algebra over the rationals, and should act on the first cohomology group, which should be a 2-dimensional vector space over the coefficient field by analogy with the case of a complex elliptic curve. However a quaternion algebra over the rationals cannot act on a 2-dimensional vector space over the rationals. The same argument eliminates the possibility of the coefficient field being the reals or the p-adic numbers, because the quaternion algebra is still a division algebra over these fields. However it does not eliminate the possibility that the coefficient field is the field of ℓ-adic numbers for some prime ℓ ≠ p, because over these fields the division algebra splits and becomes a matrix algebra, which can act on a 2-dimensional vector space. Grothendieck and Michael Artin managed to construct suitable cohomology theories over the field of ℓ-adic numbers for each prime ℓ ≠ p, called ℓ-adic cohomology.

== Grothendieck's proofs of three of the four conjectures ==
By the end of 1964 Grothendieck together with Artin and Jean-Louis Verdier (and the earlier 1960 work by Dwork) proved the Weil conjectures apart from the most difficult third conjecture above (the "Riemann hypothesis" conjecture) (Grothendieck 1965). The general theorems about étale cohomology allowed Grothendieck to prove an analogue of the Lefschetz fixed-point formula for the ℓ-adic cohomology theory, and by applying it to the Frobenius automorphism F he was able to prove the conjectured formula for the zeta function:

$$\zeta(s)=\frac{P_1(T)\cdots P_{2n-1}(T)}{P_0(T)P_2(T)\cdots P_{2n}(T)}$$

where each polynomial P_{i} is the determinant of I − TF on the ℓ-adic cohomology group H^{i}.

The rationality of the zeta function follows immediately. The functional equation for the zeta function follows from Poincaré duality for ℓ-adic cohomology, and the relation with complex Betti numbers of a lift follows from a comparison theorem between ℓ-adic and ordinary cohomology for complex varieties.

More generally, Grothendieck proved a similar formula for the zeta function (or "generalized L-function") of a sheaf F_{0}:

$$Z(X_0, F_0, t) = \prod_{x\in |X_0|}\det(1-F^*_xt^{\deg(x)}\mid F_0)^{-1}$$

as a product over cohomology groups:

$$Z(X_0, F_0, t) = \prod_i \det(1-F^* t\mid H^i_c(F))^{(-1)^{i+1}}$$

The special case of the constant sheaf gives the usual zeta function.

== Deligne's first proof of the Riemann hypothesis conjecture ==
Verdier (1974), Serre (1975), Katz (1976) and Freitag & Kiehl (1988) gave expository accounts of the first proof of Deligne (1974). Much of the background in ℓ-adic cohomology is described in (Deligne 1977).

Deligne's first proof of the remaining third Weil conjecture (the "Riemann hypothesis conjecture") used the following steps:

=== Use of Lefschetz pencils ===
- Grothendieck expressed the zeta function in terms of the trace of Frobenius on ℓ-adic cohomology groups, so the Weil conjectures for a d-dimensional variety V over a finite field with q elements depend on showing that the eigenvalues α of Frobenius acting on the ith ℓ-adic cohomology group H^{i}(V) of V have absolute values |α| = q^{i/2} (for an embedding of the algebraic elements of Q_{ℓ} into the complex numbers).
- After blowing up V and extending the base field, one may assume that the variety V has a morphism onto the projective line P^{1}, with a finite number of singular fibers with very mild (quadratic) singularities. The theory of monodromy of Lefschetz pencils, introduced for complex varieties (and ordinary cohomology) by Lefschetz (1924), and extended by Grothendieck (1972) and Deligne & Katz (1973) to ℓ-adic cohomology, relates the cohomology of V to that of its fibers. The relation depends on the space E_{x} of vanishing cycles, the subspace of the cohomology H^{d−1}(V_{x}) of a non-singular fiber V_{x}, spanned by classes that vanish on singular fibers.
- The Leray spectral sequence relates the middle cohomology group of V to the cohomology of the fiber and base. The hard part to deal with is more or less a group H^{1}(P^{1}, j_{*}E) = H^{1}_{c}(U,E), where U is the points the projective line with non-singular fibers, and j is the inclusion of U into the projective line, and E is the sheaf with fibers the spaces E_{x} of vanishing cycles.

=== The key estimate ===
The heart of Deligne's proof is to show that the sheaf E over U is pure, in other words to find the absolute values of the eigenvalues of Frobenius on its stalks. This is done by studying the zeta functions of the even powers E^{k} of E and applying Grothendieck's formula for the zeta functions as alternating products over cohomology groups. The crucial idea of considering even k powers of E was inspired by the paper Rankin (1939), who used a similar idea with k = 2 for bounding the Ramanujan tau function. Langlands (1970, section 8) pointed out that a generalization of Rankin's result for higher even values of k would imply the Ramanujan conjecture, and Deligne realized that in the case of zeta functions of varieties, Grothendieck's theory of zeta functions of sheaves provided an analogue of this generalization.

- The poles of the zeta function of E^{k} are found using Grothendieck's formula

$$Z(U,E^k,T) = \frac{\det(1-F^* T\mid H^1_c(E^k))}{\det(1-F^* T\mid H^0_c(E^k))\det(1-F^* T \mid H^2_c(E^k))}$$

and calculating the cohomology groups in the denominator explicitly. The H^{0}_{c} term is usually just 1 as U is usually not compact, and the H^{2}_{c} can be calculated explicitly as follows. Poincaré duality relates H^{2}_{c}(E^{k}) to H^{0}(E^{k}), which is in turn the space of covariants of the monodromy group, which is the geometric fundamental group of U acting on the fiber of E^{k} at a point. The fiber of E has a bilinear form induced by cup product, which is antisymmetric if d is even, and makes E into a symplectic space. (This is a little inaccurate: Deligne did later show that E∩E^{⊥} = 0 by using the hard Lefschetz theorem, this requires the Weil conjectures, and the proof of the Weil conjectures really has to use a slightly more complicated argument with E/E∩E^{⊥} rather than E.) An argument of Kazhdan and Margulis shows that the image of the monodromy group acting on E, given by the Picard–Lefschetz formula, is Zariski dense in a symplectic group and therefore has the same invariants, which are well known from classical invariant theory. Keeping track of the action of Frobenius in this calculation shows that its eigenvalues are all q^{k(d−1)/2+1}, so the zeta function of Z(E^{k},T) has poles only at T = 1/q^{k(d−1)/2+1}.

- The Euler product for the zeta function of E^{k} is

$$Z(E^k,T) = \prod_x \frac{1}{Z(E^k_x,T)}$$

If k is even then all the coefficients of the factors on the right (considered as power series in T) are non-negative; this follows by writing

$$\frac{1}{\det(1-T^{\deg(x)}F_x\mid E^k)} =\exp\left(\sum_{n>0}\frac{T^n}{n} \operatorname{Trace}(F_x^n\mid E)^k\right)$$

and using the fact that the traces of powers of F are rational, so their k powers are non-negative as k is even. Deligne proves the rationality of the traces by relating them to numbers of points of varieties, which are always (rational) integers.

- The powers series for Z(E^{k}, T) converges for T less than the absolute value 1/q^{k(d−1)/2+1} of its only possible pole. When k is even the coefficients of all its Euler factors are non-negative, so that each of the Euler factors has coefficients bounded by a constant times the coefficients of Z(E^{k}, T) and therefore converges on the same region and has no poles in this region. So for k even the polynomials Z(E^{k}_{x}, T) have no zeros in this region, or in other words the eigenvalues of Frobenius on the stalks of E^{k} have absolute value at most q^{k(d−1)/2+1}.
- This estimate can be used to find the absolute value of any eigenvalue α of Frobenius on a fiber of E as follows. For any integer k, α^{k} is an eigenvalue of Frobenius on a stalk of E^{k}, which for k even is bounded by q^{1+k(d−1)/2}. So

$$|\alpha^k|\le q^{k(d-1)/2 +1}$$

As this is true for arbitrarily large even k, this implies that

$$|\alpha|\le q^{(d-1)/2}.$$

Poincaré duality then implies that

$$|\alpha|=q^{(d-1)/2}.$$

=== Completion of the proof ===
The deduction of the Riemann hypothesis from this estimate is mostly a fairly straightforward use of standard techniques and is done as follows.

- The eigenvalues of Frobenius on H^{1}_{c}(U,E) can now be estimated as they are the zeros of the zeta function of the sheaf E. This zeta function can be written as an Euler product of zeta functions of the stalks of E, and using the estimate for the eigenvalues on these stalks shows that this product converges for |T| < q^{−d/2−1/2}, so that there are no zeros of the zeta function in this region. This implies that the eigenvalues of Frobenius on E are at most q^{d/2+1/2} in absolute value (in fact it will soon be seen that they have absolute value exactly q^{d/2}). This step of the argument is very similar to the usual proof that the Riemann zeta function has no zeros with real part greater than 1, by writing it as an Euler product.
- The conclusion of this is that the eigenvalues α of the Frobenius of a variety of even dimension d on the middle cohomology group satisfy

$$|\alpha| \le q^{d/2+1/2}$$

To obtain the Riemann hypothesis one needs to eliminate the 1/2 from the exponent. This can be done as follows. Applying this estimate to any even power V^{k} of V and using the Künneth formula shows that the eigenvalues of Frobenius on the middle cohomology of a variety V of any dimension d satisfy

$$|\alpha^k| \le q^{kd/2+1/2}$$

As this is true for arbitrarily large even k, this implies that

$$|\alpha| \le q^{d/2}$$

Poincaré duality then implies that

$$|\alpha| = q^{d/2}.$$

- This proves the Weil conjectures for the middle cohomology of a variety. The Weil conjectures for the cohomology below the middle dimension follow from this by applying the weak Lefschetz theorem, and the conjectures for cohomology above the middle dimension then follow from Poincaré duality.

== Deligne's second proof ==
Deligne (1980) found and proved a generalization of the Weil conjectures, bounding the weights of the pushforward of a sheaf. In practice it is this generalization rather than the original Weil conjectures that is mostly used in applications, such as the hard Lefschetz theorem. Much of the second proof is a rearrangement of the ideas of his first proof. The main extra idea needed is an argument closely related to the theorem of Jacques Hadamard and Charles Jean de la Vallée Poussin, used by Deligne to show that various L-series do not have zeros with real part 1.

A constructible sheaf on a variety over a finite field is called pure of weight β if for all points x the eigenvalues of the Frobenius at x all have absolute value N(x)^{β/2}, and is called mixed of weight ≤ β if it can be written as repeated extensions by pure sheaves with weights ≤ β.

Deligne's theorem states that if f is a morphism of schemes of finite type over a finite field, then R^{i}f_{!} takes mixed sheaves of weight ≤ β to mixed sheaves of weight ≤ β + i.

The original Weil conjectures follow by taking f to be a morphism from a smooth projective variety to a point and considering the constant sheaf Q_{ℓ} on the variety. This gives an upper bound on the absolute values of the eigenvalues of Frobenius, and Poincaré duality then shows that this is also a lower bound.

In general R^{i}f_{!} does not take pure sheaves to pure sheaves. However it does when a suitable form of Poincaré duality holds, for example if f is smooth and proper, or if one works with perverse sheaves rather than sheaves as in Beilinson, Bernstein & Deligne (1982).

Inspired by the work of Witten (1982) on Morse theory, Laumon (1987) found another proof, using Deligne's ℓ-adic Fourier transform, which allowed him to simplify Deligne's proof by avoiding the use of the method of Hadamard and de la Vallée Poussin. His proof generalizes the classical calculation of the absolute value of Gauss sums using the fact that the norm of a Fourier transform has a simple relation to the norm of the original function. Kiehl & Weissauer (2001) used Laumon's proof as the basis for their exposition of Deligne's theorem. Katz (2001) gave a further simplification of Laumon's proof, using monodromy in the spirit of Deligne's first proof. Kedlaya (2006) gave another proof using the Fourier transform, replacing etale cohomology with rigid cohomology.

== Applications ==
- Deligne (1980) was able to prove the hard Lefschetz theorem over finite fields using his second proof of the Weil conjectures.
- Deligne (1971) had previously shown that the Ramanujan–Petersson conjecture follows from the Weil conjectures.
- Deligne (1974, section 8) used the Weil conjectures to prove estimates for exponential sums.
- Nick Katz and William Messing (1974) were able to prove the Künneth type standard conjecture over finite fields using Deligne's proof of the Weil conjectures.
