= Weil cohomology theory =

Theory in algebraic geometry

In algebraic geometry, a Weil cohomology or Weil cohomology theory is a cohomology satisfying certain axioms concerning the interplay of algebraic cycles and cohomology groups. The name is in honor of André Weil. Any Weil cohomology theory factors uniquely through the category of Chow motives, but the category of Chow motives itself is not a Weil cohomology theory, since it is not an abelian category.

== Definition ==
Fix a base field k of arbitrary characteristic and a "coefficient field" K of characteristic zero. A Weil cohomology theory is a contravariant functor

$$H^*: \{\text{smooth projective varieties over } k \} \longrightarrow \{\text{graded } K\text{-algebras}\}$$

satisfying the axioms below. For each smooth projective algebraic variety X of dimension n over k, the graded K-algebra

$$H^*(X) = \bigoplus\nolimits_i H^i(X)$$

is required to satisfy the following:

- $H^i(X)$ is a finite-dimensional K-vector space for each integer i.
- $H^i(X) = 0$ for each i < 0 or i > 2n.
- $H^{2n}(X)$ is isomorphic to K (the so-called orientation map).
- Poincaré duality: there is a perfect pairing
  $$H^i(X) \times H^{2n-i}(X) \to H^{2n}(X) \cong K.$$
- There is a canonical Künneth isomorphism
  $$H^*(X) \otimes H^*(Y) \to H^*(X\times Y).$$
- For each integer r, there is a cycle map defined on the group $Z^r(X)$ of algebraic cycles of codimension r on X,
  $$\gamma_X : Z^r(X) \to H^{2r}(X),$$
  satisfying certain compatibility conditions with respect to functoriality of H and the Künneth isomorphism. If X is a point, the cycle map is required to be the inclusion Z ⊂ K.
- Weak Lefschetz axiom: For any smooth hyperplane section j: W ⊂ X (i.e. W = X ∩ H, H some hyperplane in the ambient projective space), the maps
  $$j^*: H^i(X) \to H^i(W)$$
  are isomorphisms for $i \leqslant n-2$ and injections for $i \leqslant n-1$.
- Hard Lefschetz axiom: Let W be a hyperplane section and $w =\gamma_X(W) \in H^2(X)$ be its image under the cycle class map. The Lefschetz operator is defined as
  $$\begin{cases} L: H^i(X) \to H^{i+2}(X) \\ x \mapsto x \cdot w, \end{cases}$$
  where the dot denotes the product in the algebra $H^*(X)$. Then
  $$L^i : H^{n-i}(X) \to H^{n+i}(X)$$
  is an isomorphism for i = 1, ..., n.

== Examples ==
There are four so-called classical Weil cohomology theories:

- singular (= Betti) cohomology, regarding varieties over C as topological spaces using their analytic topology (see GAGA),
- de Rham cohomology over a base field of characteristic zero: over C defined by differential forms and in general by means of the complex of Kähler differentials (see algebraic de Rham cohomology),
- $\ell$-adic cohomology for varieties over fields of characteristic different from $\ell$,
- crystalline cohomology.

The proofs of the axioms for Betti cohomology and de Rham cohomology are comparatively easy and classical. For $\ell$-adic cohomology, for example, most of the above properties are deep theorems.

The vanishing of Betti cohomology groups exceeding twice the dimension is clear from the fact that a (complex) manifold of complex dimension n has real dimension 2n, so these higher cohomology groups vanish (for example by comparing them to simplicial (co)homology).

The de Rham cycle map also has a down-to-earth explanation: Given a subvariety Y of complex codimension r in a complete variety X of complex dimension n, the real dimension of Y is 2n−2r, so one can integrate any differential (2n−2r)-form along Y to produce a complex number. This induces a linear functional $\textstyle\int_Y \colon \; H^{2n-2r}_{\text{dR}}(X) \to \mathbf{C}$. By Poincaré duality, to give such a functional is equivalent to giving an element of $H^{2r}_{\text{dR}}(X)$; that element is the image of Y under the cycle map.

== See also ==
- Foundations of Algebraic Geometry
