= List of things named after W. V. D. Hodge =

These are things named after W. V. D. Hodge, a Scottish mathematician.

- Hodge algebra
- Hodge–Arakelov theory
- Hodge bundle
- Hodge conjecture
- Hodge cycle
- Hodge–de Rham spectral sequence
- Hodge diamond
- Hodge duality
- Hodge filtration
- Hodge index theorem
- Hodge group
- Hodge star operator
- Hodge structure
  - Mixed Hodge structure
- Hodge–Tate module
- Hodge theory
- Mixed Hodge module
- Hodge–Arakelov theory
- p-adic Hodge theory
