= Motive (algebraic geometry) =

Structure in algebraic geometry

In algebraic geometry, a motive (or sometimes motif, following French usage) is an abstract object introduced by Alexander Grothendieck in the 1960s as part of a proposed universal cohomology theory for algebraic varieties. The idea is that theories such as Betti cohomology, de Rham cohomology, etale cohomology, and crystalline cohomology should arise as different realizations of the same underlying object. Thus, a motive of a variety is meant to capture the part of its geometry common to these cohomology theories.

For smooth varieties, pure motives can be constructed from algebraic correspondences and idempotent projections. The Chow motives give one example. For more general varieties, the (partially conjectural) theory of mixed motives extends this picture to relate motives to motivic cohomology and algebraic K-theory. Vladimir Voevodsky constructed triangulated categories of motives that provide much of the formalism expected of mixed motives.

The theory of motives is connected to algebraic cycles, Weil cohomology, and the study of motivic Galois groups. It also provides a unifying framework for open problems such as the Hodge conjecture and Tate conjecture.

== Introduction ==
The theory of motives was originally conjectured as an attempt to unify a rapidly multiplying array of cohomology theories, including Betti cohomology, de Rham cohomology, l-adic cohomology, and crystalline cohomology. The general hope is that equations like

- [projective line] = [line] + [point]
- [projective plane] = [plane] + [line] + [point]

can be put on increasingly solid mathematical footing with a deep meaning. Of course, the above equations are already known to be true in many senses, such as in the sense of CW-complex where "+" corresponds to attaching cells, and in the sense of various cohomology theories, where "+" corresponds to the direct sum.

From another viewpoint, motives continue the sequence of generalizations from rational functions on varieties to divisors on varieties to Chow groups of varieties. The generalization happens in more than one direction, since motives can be considered with respect to more types of equivalence than rational equivalence. The admissible equivalences are given by the definition of an adequate equivalence relation.

== Grothendieck and Deligne formulations ==
In the formulation of Grothendieck for smooth projective varieties, a motive is a triple $(X, p, m)$, where $X$ is a smooth projective variety, $p: X \vdash X$ is an idempotent correspondence, and m an integer; however, such a triple contains almost no information outside the context of Grothendieck's category of pure motives, where a morphism from $(X, p, m)$ to $(Y, q, n)$ is given by a correspondence of degree $n-m$. A more object-focused approach is taken by Pierre Deligne in Le Groupe Fondamental de la Droite Projective Moins Trois Points. In that article, a motive is a "system of realisations" – that is, a tuple

$$\left (M_B, M_{\mathrm{DR}}, M_{\mathbb{A}^f}, M_{\operatorname{cris},p}, \operatorname{comp}_{\mathrm{DR},B}, \operatorname{comp}_{\mathbb{A}^f, B}, \operatorname{comp}_{\operatorname{cris} p,\mathrm{DR}}, W, F_\infty, F, \phi, \phi_p \right )$$

consisting of modules

$$M_B, M_{\mathrm{DR}}, M_{\mathbb{A}^f}, M_{\operatorname{cris},p}$$

over the rings

$$\Q, \Q, \mathbb{A}^f, \Q_p,$$

respectively, various comparison isomorphisms

$$\operatorname{comp}_{\mathrm{DR},B}, \operatorname{comp}_{\mathbb{A}^f, B}, \operatorname{comp}_{\operatorname{cris} p, \mathrm{DR}}$$

between the obvious base changes of these modules, filtrations $W, F$, an action $\phi$ of the absolute Galois group $\operatorname{Gal}(\overline{\Q}, \Q)$ on $M_{\mathbb{A}^f},$ and a "Frobenius" automorphism $\phi_p$ of $M_{\operatorname{cris},p}$. This data is modeled on the cohomologies of a smooth projective $\Q$-variety and the structures and compatibilities they admit, and gives an idea about what kind of information is contained in a motive.

== Definition of pure motives ==
The category of pure motives often proceeds in three steps. Below we describe the case of Chow motives $\operatorname{Chow}(k)$, where k is any field.

=== First step: category of (degree 0) correspondences, Corr(k) ===
The objects of $\operatorname{Corr}(k)$ are simply smooth projective varieties over k. The morphisms are correspondences. They generalize morphisms of varieties $X \to Y$, which can be associated with their graphs in $X \times Y$, to fixed dimensional Chow cycles on $X \times Y$.

It will be useful to describe correspondences of arbitrary degree, although morphisms in $\operatorname{Corr}(k)$ are correspondences of degree 0. In detail, let X and Y be smooth projective varieties and consider a decomposition of X into connected components:

$$X = \coprod_i X_i, \qquad d_i := \dim X_i.$$

If $r\in \Z$, then the correspondences of degree r from X to Y are

$$\operatorname{Corr}^r(k)(X, Y) := \bigoplus_i A^{d_i+r}(X_i \times Y),$$

where $A^k(X)$ denotes the Chow-cycles of codimension k. Correspondences are often denoted using the "⊢"-notation, e.g., $\alpha : X \vdash Y$. For any $\alpha\in \operatorname{Corr}^r(X, Y)$ and $\beta\in \operatorname{Corr}^s(Y,Z),$ their composition is defined by

$$\beta \circ \alpha := \pi_{XZ*} \left (\pi^{*}_{XY}(\alpha) \cdot \pi^{*}_{YZ}(\beta) \right ) \in \operatorname{Corr}^{r+s}(X, Z),$$

where the dot denotes the product in the Chow ring (i.e., intersection).

Returning to constructing the category $\operatorname{Corr}(k),$ notice that the composition of degree 0 correspondences is degree 0. Hence we define morphisms of $\operatorname{Corr}(k)$ to be degree 0 correspondences.

The following association is a functor (here $\Gamma_f \subseteq X\times Y$ denotes the graph of $f: X\to Y$):

$$F : \begin{cases}
\operatorname{SmProj}(k) \longrightarrow \operatorname{Corr}(k) \\
X \longmapsto X \\
f \longmapsto \Gamma_f
\end{cases}$$

Just like $\operatorname{SmProj}(k),$ the category $\operatorname{Corr}(k)$ has direct sums (X ⊕ Y := X ∐ Y) and tensor products (X ⊗ Y := X × Y). It is a preadditive category. The sum of morphisms is defined by

$$\alpha + \beta := (\alpha, \beta) \in A^{*}(X \times X) \oplus A^{*}(Y \times Y) \hookrightarrow A^{*} \left (\left (X \coprod Y \right ) \times \left (X \coprod Y \right ) \right ).$$

=== Second step: category of pure effective Chow motives, Chow^{eff}(k) ===
The transition to motives is made by taking the pseudo-abelian envelope of $\operatorname{Corr}(k)$:

$$\operatorname{Chow}^\operatorname{eff}(k) := \operatorname{Split}(\operatorname{Corr}(k))$$.

In other words, effective Chow motives are pairs of smooth projective varieties X and idempotent correspondences α: X ⊢ X, and morphisms are of a certain type of correspondence:

$$\operatorname{Ob} \left (\operatorname{Chow}^\operatorname{eff}(k) \right ) := \{ (X, \alpha) \mid (\alpha : X \vdash X) \in \operatorname{Corr}(k) \mbox{ such that } \alpha \circ \alpha = \alpha \}.$$
$$\operatorname{Mor}((X, \alpha), (Y, \beta)) := \{ f : X \vdash Y | f \circ \alpha = f = \beta \circ f \}.$$

Composition is the above defined composition of correspondences, and the identity morphism of (X, α) is defined to be α : X ⊢ X.

The association,

$$h : \begin{cases}
\operatorname{SmProj}(k) & \longrightarrow \operatorname{Chow^{eff}}(k) \\
X & \longmapsto [X] := (X, \Delta_X) \\
f & \longmapsto [f] := \Gamma_f \subset X \times Y
\end{cases}$$,

where Δ_{X} := [id_{X}] denotes the diagonal of X × X, is a functor. The motive [X] is often called the motive associated to the variety X.

As intended, Chow^{eff}(k) is a pseudo-abelian category. The direct sum of effective motives is given by

$$([X], \alpha) \oplus ([Y], \beta) := \left ( \left [X \coprod Y \right ], \alpha + \beta \right ),$$

The tensor product of effective motives is defined by

$$([X], \alpha) \otimes ([Y], \beta) := (X \times Y, \pi_X^{*}\alpha \cdot \pi_Y^{*}\beta),$$

where

$$\pi_X : (X \times Y) \times (X \times Y) \to X \times X, \quad \text{and} \quad \pi_Y : (X \times Y) \times (X \times Y) \to Y \times Y.$$

The tensor product of morphisms may also be defined. Let f_{1} : (X_{1}, α_{1}) → (Y_{1}, β_{1}) and f_{2} : (X_{2}, α_{2}) → (Y_{2}, β_{2}) be morphisms of motives. Then let γ_{1} ∈ A^{*}(X_{1} × Y_{1}) and γ_{2} ∈ A^{*}(X_{2} × Y_{2}) be representatives of f_{1} and f_{2}. Then

$$f_1 \otimes f_2 : (X_1, \alpha_1) \otimes (X_2, \alpha_2) \vdash (Y_1, \beta_1) \otimes (Y_2, \beta_2), \qquad f_1 \otimes f_2 := \pi^{*}_1 \gamma_1 \cdot \pi^{*}_2 \gamma_2$$,

where π_{i} : X_{1} × X_{2} × Y_{1} × Y_{2} → X_{i} × Y_{i} are the projections.

=== Third step: category of pure Chow motives, Chow(k) ===
To proceed to motives, we adjoin to Chow^{eff}(k) a formal inverse (with respect to the tensor product) of a motive called the Lefschetz motive. The effect is that motives become triples instead of pairs. The Lefschetz motive L is

$$L := (\mathbb{P}^1, \lambda), \qquad \lambda := pt \times \mathbb{P}^1 \in A^1(\mathbb{P}^1 \times \mathbb{P}^1)$$.

If we define the motive 1, called the trivial Tate motive, by 1 := h(Spec(k)), then the elegant equation

$$[\mathbb{P}^1] = \mathbf{1} \oplus L$$

holds, since

$$\mathbf{1} \cong \left (\mathbb{P}^1, \mathbb{P}^1 \times \operatorname{pt} \right ).$$

The tensor inverse of the Lefschetz motive is known as the Tate motive, T := L^{−1}. Then we define the category of pure Chow motives by

$$\operatorname{Chow}(k) := \operatorname{Chow}^\operatorname{eff}(k)[T]$$.

A motive is then a triple

$$(X \in \operatorname{SmProj}(k), p: X \vdash X, n \in \Z )$$

such that morphisms are given by correspondences

$$f : (X, p, m) \to (Y, q, n), \quad f \in \operatorname{Corr}^{n-m}(X, Y) \mbox{ such that } f \circ p = f = q \circ f,$$

and the composition of morphisms comes from composition of correspondences.

As intended, $\operatorname{Chow}(k)$ is a rigid pseudo-abelian category.

=== Other types of motives ===
In order to define an intersection product, cycles must be "movable" so we can intersect them in general position. Choosing a suitable equivalence relation on cycles will guarantee that every pair of cycles has an equivalent pair in general position that we can intersect. The Chow groups are defined using rational equivalence, but other equivalences are possible, and each defines a different sort of motive. Examples of equivalences, from strongest to weakest, are

- Rational equivalence
- Algebraic equivalence
- Smash-nilpotence equivalence (sometimes called Voevodsky equivalence)
- Homological equivalence (in the sense of Weil cohomology)
- Numerical equivalence

The literature occasionally calls every type of pure motive a Chow motive, in which case a motive with respect to algebraic equivalence would be called a Chow motive modulo algebraic equivalence.

== Mixed motives ==
For a fixed base field k, the category of mixed motives is a conjectural abelian tensor category $MM(k)$, together with a contravariant functor

$$\operatorname{Var}(k) \to MM(k)$$

taking values on all varieties (not just smooth projective ones as it was the case with pure motives). This should be such that motivic cohomology defined by

$$\operatorname{Ext}^*_{MM}(1, ?)$$

coincides with the one predicted by algebraic K-theory, and contains the category of Chow motives in a suitable sense (and other properties). The existence of such a category was conjectured by Alexander Beilinson.

Instead of constructing such a category, it was proposed by Deligne to first construct a category DM having the properties one expects for the derived category

$$D^b(MM(k))$$.

Getting MM back from DM would then be accomplished by a (conjectural) motivic t-structure.

The current state of the theory is that we do have a suitable category DM. Already this category is useful in applications. Vladimir Voevodsky's Fields Medal-winning proof of the Milnor conjecture uses these motives as a key ingredient.

There are different definitions due to Hanamura, Levine and Voevodsky. They are known to be equivalent in most cases and we will give Voevodsky's definition below. The category contains Chow motives as a full subcategory and gives the "right" motivic cohomology. However, Voevodsky also shows that (with integral coefficients) it does not admit a motivic t-structure.

=== Geometric mixed motives ===
We will fix a field k of characteristic 0 and let $A =\Q,\Z$ be our coefficient ring.

==== Smooth varieties with correspondences ====
Given a smooth variety X and a variety Y call an integral closed subscheme $W \subset X \times Y$ which is finite over X and surjective over a component of Y a prime correspondence from X to Y. Then, we can take the set of prime correspondences from X to Y and construct a free A-module $C_A(X,Y)$. Its elements are called finite correspondences. Then, we can form an additive category $\mathcal{SmCor}$ whose objects are smooth varieties and morphisms are given by smooth correspondences. The only non-trivial part of this "definition" is the fact that we need to describe compositions. These are given by a push-pull formula from the theory of Chow rings.

Typical examples of prime correspondences come from the graph $\Gamma_f \subset X\times Y$ of a morphism of varieties $f:X \to Y$.

==== Localizing the homotopy category ====
From here we can form the homotopy category $K^b(\mathcal{SmCor})$ of bounded complexes of smooth correspondences. Here smooth varieties will be denoted $[X]$. If we localize this category with respect to the smallest thick subcategory (meaning it is closed under extensions) containing morphisms

$$[X\times\mathbb{A}^1] \to [X]$$

and

$$[U\cap V] \xrightarrow{j_U' + j_V'} [U]\oplus [V] \xrightarrow{j_U - j_V} [X]$$

then we can form the triangulated category of effective geometric motives $\mathcal{DM}_\text{gm}^\text{eff}(k,A).$ Note that the first class of morphisms are localizing $\mathbb{A}^1$-homotopies of varieties while the second will give the category of geometric mixed motives the Mayer–Vietoris sequence.

Also, note that this category has a tensor structure given by the product of varieties, so $[X]\otimes[Y] = [X\times Y]$.

==== Inverting the Tate motive ====
Using the triangulated structure we can construct a triangle

$$\mathbb{L} \to [\mathbb{P}^1] \to [\operatorname{Spec}(k)] \xrightarrow{[+1]}$$

from the canonical map $\mathbb{P}^1 \to \operatorname{Spec}(k)$. We will set $A(1) = \mathbb{L}[-2]$ and call it the Tate motive. Taking the iterative tensor product lets us construct $A(k)$. If we have an effective geometric motive M we let $M(k)$ denote $M \otimes A(k).$ Moreover, this behaves functorially and forms a triangulated functor. Finally, we can define the category of geometric mixed motives $\mathcal{DM}_{gm}$ as the category of pairs $(M,n)$ for M an effective geometric mixed motive and n an integer representing the twist by the Tate motive. The hom-groups are then the colimit

$$\operatorname{Hom}_{\mathcal{DM}}((A,n),(B,m))=\lim_{k\geq -n,-m} \operatorname{Hom}_{\mathcal{DM}_{gm}^\operatorname{eff}}(A(k+n),B(k+m))$$

== Examples of motives ==
=== Tate motives ===
There are several elementary examples of motives which are readily accessible. One of them being the Tate motives, denoted $\mathbb{Q}(n)$, $\mathbb{Z}(n)$, or $A(n)$, depending on the coefficients used in the construction of the category of motives. These are fundamental building blocks in the category of motives because they form the "other part" besides Abelian varieties.

=== Motives of curves ===
The motive of a curve can be explicitly understood with relative ease: their Chow ring is just
$$\Z\oplus \text{Pic}(C)$$
for any smooth projective curve $C$, hence Jacobians embed into the category of motives.

== Explanation for non-specialists ==
A commonly applied technique in mathematics is to study objects carrying a particular structure by introducing a category whose morphisms preserve this structure. Then one may ask when two given objects are isomorphic, and ask for a "particularly nice" representative in each isomorphism class. The classification of algebraic varieties, i.e. application of this idea in the case of algebraic varieties, is very difficult due to the highly non-linear structure of the objects. The relaxed question of studying varieties up to birational isomorphism has led to the field of birational geometry. Another way to handle the question is to attach to a given variety X an object of more linear nature, i.e. an object amenable to the techniques of linear algebra, for example a vector space. This "linearization" goes usually under the name of cohomology.

There are several important cohomology theories, which reflect different structural aspects of varieties. The (partly conjectural) theory of motives is an attempt to find a universal way to linearize algebraic varieties, i.e. motives are supposed to provide a cohomology theory that embodies all these particular cohomologies. For example, the genus of a smooth projective curve C which is an interesting invariant of the curve, is an integer, which can be read off the dimension of the first Betti cohomology group of C. So, the motive of the curve should contain the genus information. Of course, the genus is a rather coarse invariant, so the motive of C is more than just this number.

== The search for a universal cohomology ==
Each algebraic variety X has a corresponding motive [X], so the simplest examples of motives are:

- [point]
- [projective line] = [point] + [line]
- [projective plane] = [plane] + [line] + [point]

These 'equations' hold in many situations, namely for de Rham cohomology and Betti cohomology, l-adic cohomology, the number of points over any finite field, and in multiplicative notation for local zeta-functions.

The general idea is that one motive has the same structure in any reasonable cohomology theory with good formal properties; in particular, any Weil cohomology theory will have such properties. There are different Weil cohomology theories, they apply in different situations and have values in different categories, and reflect different structural aspects of the variety in question:

- Betti cohomology is defined for varieties over (subfields of) the complex numbers, it has the advantage of being defined over the integers and is a topological invariant
- de Rham cohomology (for varieties over $\Complex$) comes with a mixed Hodge structure, it is a differential-geometric invariant
- l-adic cohomology (over any field of characteristic ≠ l) has a canonical Galois group action, i.e. has values in representations of the (absolute) Galois group
- crystalline cohomology

All these cohomology theories share common properties, e.g. existence of Mayer-Vietoris sequences, homotopy invariance $H^*(X) \cong H^*(X\times \mathbb{A}^1),$ the product of X with the affine line) and others. Moreover, they are linked by comparison isomorphisms, for example Betti cohomology $H^*_{\text{Betti}}(X, \Z/n)$ of a smooth variety X over $\Complex$ with finite coefficients is isomorphic to l-adic cohomology with finite coefficients.

The theory of motives is an attempt to find a universal theory which embodies all these particular cohomologies and their structures and provides a framework for "equations" like

[projective line] = [line]+[point].

In particular, calculating the motive of any variety X directly gives all the information about the several Weil cohomology theories H^{*}_{Betti}(X), H^{*}_{DR}(X) etc.

Beginning with Grothendieck, people have tried to precisely define this theory for many years.

=== Motivic cohomology ===
Motivic cohomology itself had been invented before the creation of mixed motives by means of algebraic K-theory. The above category provides a neat way to (re)define it by

$$H^n(X,m) := H^n(X, \Z(m)) := \operatorname{Hom}_{DM}(X, \Z(m)[n]),$$

where n and m are integers and $\Z(m)$ is the m-th tensor power of the Tate object $\Z(1),$ which in Voevodsky's setting is the complex $\mathbb{P}^1 \to \operatorname{pt}$ shifted by –2, and [n] means the usual shift in the triangulated category.

== Conjectures related to motives ==
The standard conjectures were first formulated in terms of the interplay of algebraic cycles and Weil cohomology theories. The category of pure motives provides a categorical framework for these conjectures.

The standard conjectures are commonly considered to be very hard and are open in the general case. Grothendieck, with Bombieri, showed the depth of the motivic approach by producing a conditional (very short and elegant) proof of the Weil conjectures (which are proven by different means by Deligne), assuming the standard conjectures to hold.

For example, the Künneth standard conjecture, which states the existence of algebraic cycles π^{i} ⊂ X × X inducing the canonical projectors H^{*}(X) → H^{i}(X) ↣ H^{*}(X) (for any Weil cohomology H) implies that every pure motive M decomposes in graded pieces of weight n: M = ⨁Gr_{n}M. The terminology weights comes from a similar decomposition of, say, de-Rham cohomology of smooth projective varieties, see Hodge theory.

Conjecture D, stating the concordance of numerical and homological equivalence, implies the equivalence of pure motives with respect to homological and numerical equivalence. (In particular the former category of motives would not depend on the choice of the Weil cohomology theory). Jannsen (1992) proved the following unconditional result: the category of (pure) motives over a field is abelian and semisimple if and only if the chosen equivalence relation is numerical equivalence.

The Hodge conjecture, may be neatly reformulated using motives: it holds iff the Hodge realization mapping any pure motive with rational coefficients (over a subfield $k$ of $\Complex$) to its Hodge structure is a full functor $H:M(k)_{\Q} \to HS_{\Q}$ (rational Hodge structures). Here pure motive means pure motive with respect to homological equivalence.

Similarly, the Tate conjecture is equivalent to: the so-called Tate realization, i.e. ℓ-adic cohomology, is a full functor $H: M(k)_{\Q_\ell} \to \operatorname{Rep}_{\ell} (\operatorname{Gal}(k))$ (pure motives up to homological equivalence, continuous representations of the absolute Galois group of the base field k), which takes values in semi-simple representations. (The latter part is automatic in the case of the Hodge analogue).

== Tannakian formalism and motivic Galois group ==
To motivate the (conjectural) motivic Galois group, fix a field k and consider the functor

finite separable extensions K of k → non-empty finite sets with a (continuous) transitive action of the absolute Galois group of k

which maps K to the (finite) set of embeddings of K into an algebraic closure of k. In Galois theory this functor is shown to be an equivalence of categories. Notice that fields are 0-dimensional. Motives of this kind are called Artin motives. By $\Q$-linearizing the above objects, another way of expressing the above is to say that Artin motives are equivalent to finite $\Q$-vector spaces together with an action of the Galois group.

The objective of the motivic Galois group is to extend the above equivalence to higher-dimensional varieties. In order to do this, the technical machinery of Tannakian category theory (going back to Tannaka–Krein duality, but a purely algebraic theory) is used. Its purpose is to shed light on both the Hodge conjecture and the Tate conjecture, the outstanding questions in algebraic cycle theory. Fix a Weil cohomology theory H. It gives a functor from M_{num} (pure motives using numerical equivalence) to finite-dimensional $\Q$-vector spaces. It can be shown that the former category is a Tannakian category. Assuming the equivalence of homological and numerical equivalence, i.e. the above standard conjecture D, the functor H is an exact faithful tensor-functor. Applying the Tannakian formalism, one concludes that M_{num} is equivalent to the category of representations of an algebraic group G, known as the motivic Galois group.

The motivic Galois group is to the theory of motives what the Mumford–Tate group is to Hodge theory. Again speaking in rough terms, the Hodge and Tate conjectures are types of invariant theory (the spaces that are morally the algebraic cycles are picked out by invariance under a group, if one sets up the correct definitions). The motivic Galois group has the surrounding representation theory. (What it is not, is a Galois group; however in terms of the Tate conjecture and Galois representations on étale cohomology, it predicts the image of the Galois group, or, more accurately, its Lie algebra.)

== See also ==
- Ring of periods
- Motivic cohomology
- Presheaf with transfers
- Mixed Hodge module
- Motivic L-function
- Nori motive
- motivic sheaf
