= Hodge theorem =

Hodge theorem may refer to:

- Hodge theory
- Hodge index theorem
