= Griffiths group =

In mathematics, more specifically in algebraic geometry, the Griffiths group of a projective complex manifold X measures the difference between homological equivalence and algebraic equivalence, which are two important equivalence relations of algebraic cycles.

More precisely, it is defined as

$$\operatorname{Griff}^k(X) := Z^k(X)_\mathrm{hom} / Z^k(X)_\mathrm{alg}$$

where $Z^k(X)$ denotes the group of algebraic cycles of some fixed codimension k and the subscripts indicate the groups that are homologically trivial, respectively algebraically equivalent to zero.

This group was introduced by Phillip Griffiths who showed that for a general quintic in $\mathbf P^4$ (projective 4-space), the group $\operatorname{Griff}^2(X)$ is not a torsion group.
