= Nori motive =

In algebraic geometry, a Nori motive is a mixed motive constructed by Madhav Nori. Today, it is known that Nori's 1-motive coincides with that of Ayoub.

The construction is based on Nori's basic lemma and his Tannakian theorem.

== See also ==
- motivic sheaf
