= Algebraic cycle =

Concept from algebraic geometry

In mathematics, an algebraic cycle on an algebraic variety V is a formal linear combination of subvarieties of V. These are the part of the algebraic topology of V that is directly accessible by algebraic methods. Understanding the algebraic cycles on a variety can give profound insights into the structure of the variety.

The most trivial case is codimension zero cycles, which are linear combinations of the irreducible components of the variety. The first non-trivial case is of codimension one subvarieties, called divisors. The earliest work on algebraic cycles focused on the case of divisors, particularly divisors on algebraic curves. Divisors on algebraic curves are formal linear combinations of points on the curve. Classical work on algebraic curves related these to intrinsic data, such as the regular differentials on a compact Riemann surface, and to extrinsic properties, such as embeddings of the curve into projective space.

While divisors on higher-dimensional varieties continue to play an important role in determining the structure of the variety, on varieties of dimension two or more there are also higher codimension cycles to consider. The behavior of these cycles is strikingly different from that of divisors. For example, every curve has a constant N such that every divisor of degree zero is linearly equivalent to a difference of two effective divisors of degree at most N. David Mumford proved that, on a smooth complete complex algebraic surface S with positive geometric genus, the analogous statement for the group $\operatorname{CH}^2(S)$ of rational equivalence classes of codimension two cycles in S is false. The hypothesis that the geometric genus is positive essentially means (by the Lefschetz theorem on (1,1)-classes) that the cohomology group $H^2(S)$ contains transcendental information, and in effect Mumford's theorem implies that, despite $\operatorname{CH}^2(S)$ having a purely algebraic definition, it shares transcendental information with $H^2(S)$. Mumford's theorem has since been greatly generalized.

The behavior of algebraic cycles ranks among the most important open questions in modern mathematics. The Hodge conjecture, one of the Clay Mathematics Institute's Millennium Prize Problems, predicts that the topology of a complex algebraic variety forces the existence of certain algebraic cycles. The Tate conjecture makes a similar prediction for étale cohomology. Alexander Grothendieck's standard conjectures on algebraic cycles yield enough cycles to construct his category of motives and would imply that algebraic cycles play a vital role in any cohomology theory of algebraic varieties. Conversely, Alexander Beilinson proved that the existence of a category of motives implies the standard conjectures. Additionally, cycles are connected to algebraic K-theory by Bloch's formula, which expresses groups of cycles modulo rational equivalence as the cohomology of K-theory sheaves.

== Definition ==
Let X be a scheme which is finite type over a field k. An algebraic r-cycle on X is a formal linear combination

$$\sum n_i [V_i]$$

of r-dimensional closed integral k-subschemes of X. The coefficient n_{i} is the multiplicity of V_{i}. The set of all r-cycles is the free abelian group

$$Z_r X = \bigoplus_{V \subseteq X} \mathbf{Z} \cdot [V],$$

where the sum is over closed integral subschemes V of X. The groups of cycles for varying r together form a group

$$Z_* X = \bigoplus_r Z_r X.$$

This is called the group of algebraic cycles, and any element is called an algebraic cycle. A cycle is effective or positive if all its coefficients are non-negative.

Closed integral subschemes of X are in one-to-one correspondence with the scheme-theoretic points of X under the map that, in one direction, takes each subscheme to its generic point, and in the other direction, takes each point to the unique reduced subscheme supported on the closure of the point. Consequently $Z_* X$ can also be described as the free abelian group on the points of X.

A cycle $\alpha$ is rationally equivalent to zero, written $\alpha \sim 0$, if there are a finite number of $(r + 1)$-dimensional subvarieties $W_i$ of $X$ and non-zero rational functions $r_i \in k(W_i)^\times$ such that $\alpha = \sum [\operatorname{div}_{W_i}(r_i)]$, where $\operatorname{div}_{W_i}$ denotes the divisor of a rational function on W_{i}. The cycles rationally equivalent to zero are a subgroup $Z_r(X)_{\text{rat}} \subseteq Z_r(X)$, and the group of r-cycles modulo rational equivalence is the quotient

$$A_r(X) = Z_r(X) / Z_r(X)_{\text{rat}}.$$

This group is also denoted $\operatorname{CH}_r(X)$. Elements of the group

$$A_*(X) = \bigoplus_r A_r(X)$$

are called cycle classes on X. Cycle classes are said to be effective or positive if they can be represented by an effective cycle.

If X is smooth, projective, and of pure dimension N, the above groups are sometimes reindexed cohomologically as

$$Z^{N - r} X = Z_r X$$

and

$$A^{N - r} X = A_r X.$$

In this case, $A^* X$ is called the Chow ring of X because it has a multiplication operation given by the intersection product.

There are several variants of the above definition. We may substitute another ring for integers as our coefficient ring. The case of rational coefficients is widely used. Working with families of cycles over a base, or using cycles in arithmetic situations, requires a relative setup. Let $\phi \colon X \to S$, where S is a regular Noetherian scheme. An r-cycle is a formal sum of closed integral subschemes of X whose relative dimension is r; here the relative dimension of $Y \subseteq X$ is the transcendence degree of $k(Y)$ over $k(\overline{\phi(Y)})$ minus the codimension of $\overline{\phi(Y)}$ in S.

Rational equivalence can also be replaced by several other coarser equivalence relations on algebraic cycles. Other equivalence relations of interest include algebraic equivalence, homological equivalence for a fixed cohomology theory (such as singular cohomology or étale cohomology), numerical equivalence, as well as all of the above modulo torsion. These equivalence relations have (partially conjectural) applications to the theory of motives.

== Flat pullback and proper pushforward ==
There is a covariant and a contravariant functoriality of the group of algebraic cycles. Let f : X → X' be a map of varieties.

If f is flat of some constant relative dimension (i.e. all fibers have the same dimension), we can define for any subvariety Y' ⊂ X':

$$f^*([Y']) = [f^{-1}(Y')]\,\!$$

which by assumption has the same codimension as Y′.

Conversely, if f is proper, for Y a subvariety of X the pushforward is defined to be

$$f_*([Y]) = n [f(Y)]\,\!$$

where n is the degree of the extension of function fields [k(Y) : k(f(Y))] if the restriction of f to Y is finite and 0 otherwise.

By linearity, these definitions extend to homomorphisms of abelian groups

$$f^* \colon Z^k(X') \to Z^k(X) \quad\text{and}\quad f_* \colon Z_k(X) \to Z_k(X') \,\!$$

(the latter by virtue of the convention) are homomorphisms of abelian groups. See Chow ring for a discussion of the functoriality related to the ring structure.

== See also ==
- Divisor (algebraic geometry)
- Relative cycle
