= Presheaf with transfers =

In algebraic geometry, a presheaf with transfers is, roughly, a presheaf that, like cohomology theory, comes with pushforwards, “transfer” maps. Precisely, it is, by definition, a contravariant additive functor from the category of finite correspondences (defined below) to the category of abelian groups (in category theory, “presheaf” is another term for a contravariant functor).

When a presheaf F with transfers is restricted to the subcategory of smooth separated schemes, it can be viewed as a presheaf on the category with extra maps $F(Y) \to F(X)$, not coming from morphisms of schemes but also from finite correspondences from X to Y

A presheaf F with transfers is said to be $\mathbb{A}^1$-homotopy invariant if $F(X) \simeq F(X \times \mathbb{A}^1)$ for every X.

For example, Chow groups as well as motivic cohomology groups form presheaves with transfers.

== Finite correspondence ==
Let $X, Y$ be algebraic schemes (i.e., separated and of finite type over a field) and suppose $X$ is smooth. Then an elementary correspondence is an irreducible closed subscheme $W \subset X_i \times Y$, $X_i$ some connected component of X, such that the projection $\operatorname{Supp}(W) \to X_i$ is finite and surjective. Let $\operatorname{Cor}(X, Y)$ be the free abelian group generated by elementary correspondences from X to Y; elements of $\operatorname{Cor}(X, Y)$ are then called finite correspondences.

The category of finite correspondences, denoted by $Cor$, is the category where the objects are smooth algebraic schemes over a field; where a Hom set is given as: $\operatorname{Hom}(X, Y) = \operatorname{Cor}(X, Y)$ and where the composition is defined as in intersection theory: given elementary correspondences $\alpha$ from $X$ to $Y$ and $\beta$ from $Y$ to $Z$, their composition is:

$$\beta \circ \alpha = p_{{13}, *}(p^*_{12} \alpha \cdot p^*_{23} \beta)$$

where $\cdot$ denotes the intersection product and $p_{12}: X \times Y \times Z \to X \times Y$, etc. Note that the category $Cor$ is an additive category since each Hom set $\operatorname{Cor}(X, Y)$ is an abelian group.

This category contains the category $\textbf{Sm}$ of smooth algebraic schemes as a subcategory in the following sense: there is a faithful functor $\textbf{Sm} \to Cor$ that sends an object to itself and a morphism $f: X \to Y$ to the graph of $f$.

With the product of schemes taken as the monoid operation, the category $Cor$ is a symmetric monoidal category.

== Sheaves with transfers ==
The basic notion underlying all of the different theories are presheaves with transfers. These are contravariant additive functors

$F:\text{Cor}_k \to \text{Ab}$

and their associated category is typically denoted $\mathbf{PST}(k)$, or just $\mathbf{PST}$ if the underlying field is understood. Each of the categories in this section are abelian categories, hence they are suitable for doing homological algebra.

=== Etale sheaves with transfers ===
These are defined as presheaves with transfers such that the restriction to any scheme $X$ is an etale sheaf. That is, if $U \to X$ is an etale cover, and $F$ is a presheaf with transfers, it is an Etale sheaf with transfers if the sequence

$0 \to F(X) \xrightarrow{\text{diag}} F(U) \xrightarrow{(+,-)} F(U\times_XU)$

is exact and there is an isomorphism

$F(X\coprod Y) = F(X)\oplus F(Y)$

for any fixed smooth schemes $X,Y$.

=== Nisnevich sheaves with transfers ===
There is a similar definition for Nisnevich sheaf with transfers, where the Etale topology is switched with the Nisnevich topology.

== Examples ==
=== Units ===
The sheaf of units $\mathcal{O}^*$ is a presheaf with transfers. Any correspondence $W \subset X \times Y$ induces a finite map of degree $N$ over $X$, hence there is the induced morphism

$\mathcal{O}^*(Y) \to \mathcal{O}^*(W) \xrightarrow{N} \mathcal{O}^*(X)$

showing it is a presheaf with transfers.

=== Representable functors ===
One of the basic examples of presheaves with transfers are given by representable functors. Given a smooth scheme $X$ there is a presheaf with transfers $\mathbb{Z}_{tr}(X)$ sending $U \mapsto \text{Hom}_{Cor}(U,X)$.

==== Representable functor associated to a point ====
The associated presheaf with transfers of $\text{Spec}(k)$ is denoted $\mathbb{Z}$.

=== Pointed schemes ===
Another class of elementary examples comes from pointed schemes $(X,x)$ with $x: \text{Spec}(k) \to X$. This morphism induces a morphism $x_*:\mathbb{Z} \to \mathbb{Z}_{tr}(X)$ whose cokernel is denoted $\mathbb{Z}_{tr}(X,x)$. There is a splitting coming from the structure morphism $X \to \text{Spec}(k)$, so there is an induced map $\mathbb{Z}_{tr}(X) \to \mathbb{Z}$, hence $\mathbb{Z}_{tr}(X) \cong \mathbb{Z}\oplus\mathbb{Z}_{tr}(X,x)$.

==== Representable functor associated to A^{1}-0 ====
There is a representable functor associated to the pointed scheme $\mathbb{G}_m = (\mathbb{A}^1-\{0\},1)$ denoted $\mathbb{Z}_{tr}(\mathbb{G}_m)$.

=== Smash product of pointed schemes ===
Given a finite family of pointed schemes $(X_i, x_i)$ there is an associated presheaf with transfers $\mathbb{Z}_{tr}((X_1,x_1)\wedge\cdots\wedge(X_n,x_n))$, also denoted $\mathbb{Z}_{tr}(X_1\wedge\cdots\wedge X_n)$ from their Smash product. This is defined as the cokernel of

$\text{coker}\left( \bigoplus_i \mathbb{Z}_{tr}(X_1\times \cdots \times \hat{X}_i \times \cdots \times X_n) \xrightarrow{id\times \cdots \times x_i \times \cdots \times id} \mathbb{Z}_{tr}(X_1\times\cdots\times X_n) \right)$

For example, given two pointed schemes $(X,x),(Y,y)$, there is the associated presheaf with transfers $\mathbb{Z}_{tr}(X\wedge Y)$ equal to the cokernel of

$$\mathbb{Z}_{tr}(X)\oplus \mathbb{Z}_{tr}(Y) \xrightarrow{ \begin{bmatrix}1\times y & x\times 1  \end{bmatrix}} \mathbb{Z}_{tr}(X\times Y)$$

This is analogous to the smash product in topology since $X\wedge Y = (X \times Y) / (X \vee Y)$ where the equivalence relation mods out $X\times \{y\} \cup \{x\}\times Y$.

==== Wedge of single space ====
A finite wedge of a pointed space $(X,x)$ is denoted $\mathbb{Z}_{tr}(X^{\wedge q}) = \mathbb{Z}_{tr}(X\wedge \cdots \wedge X)$. One example of this construction is $\mathbb{Z}_{tr}(\mathbb{G}_m^{\wedge q})$, which is used in the definition of the motivic complexes $\mathbb{Z}(q)$ used in Motivic cohomology.

== Homotopy invariant sheaves ==
A presheaf with transfers $F$ is homotopy invariant if the projection morphism $p:X\times\mathbb{A}^1 \to X$ induces an isomorphism $p^*:F(X) \to F(X\times \mathbb{A}^1)$ for every smooth scheme $X$. There is a construction associating a homotopy invariant sheaf for every presheaf with transfers $F$ using an analogue of simplicial homology.

=== Simplicial homology ===
There is a scheme

$\Delta^n = \text{Spec}\left( \frac{k[x_0,\ldots,x_n]}{\sum_{0 \leq i \leq n} x_i - 1} \right)$

giving a cosimplicial scheme $\Delta^*$, where the morphisms $\partial_j:\Delta^n \to \Delta^{n+1}$ are given by $x_j = 0$. That is,

$\frac{k[x_0,\ldots,x_{n+1}]}{(\sum_{0 \leq i \leq n} x_i - 1)} \to \frac{k[x_0,\ldots,x_{n+1}]}{(\sum_{0 \leq i \leq n} x_i - 1, x_j)}$

gives the induced morphism $\partial_j$. Then, to a presheaf with transfers $F$, there is an associated complex of presheaves with transfers $C_*F$ sending

$C_iF: U \mapsto F(U \times \Delta^i)$

and has the induced chain morphisms

$\sum_{i=0}^j (-1)^i \partial_i^*: C_jF \to C_{j-1}F$

giving a complex of presheaves with transfers. The homology invariant presheaves with transfers $H_i(C_*F)$ are homotopy invariant. In particular, $H_0(C_*F)$ is the universal homotopy invariant presheaf with transfers associated to $F$.

==== Relation with Chow group of zero cycles ====
Denote $H_0^{sing}(X/k) := H_0(C_*\mathbb{Z}_{tr}(X))(\text{Spec}(k))$. There is an induced surjection $H_0^{sing}(X/k) \to \text{CH}_0(X)$ which is an isomorphism for $X$ projective.

==== Zeroth homology of Z_{tr}(X) ====
The zeroth homology of $H_0(C_*\mathbb{Z}_{tr}(Y))(X)$ is $\text{Hom}_{Cor}(X,Y)/\mathbb{A}^1 \text{ homotopy}$ where homotopy equivalence is given as follows. Two finite correspondences $f,g:X \to Y$ are $\mathbb{A}^1$-homotopy equivalent if there is a morphism $h:X\times\mathbb{A}^1 \to X$ such that $h|_{X\times 0} = f$ and $h|_{X \times 1} = g$.

== Motivic complexes ==
For Voevodsky's category of mixed motives, the motive $M(X)$ associated to $X$, is the class of $C_*\mathbb{Z}_{tr}(X)$ in $DM_{Nis}^{eff,-}(k,R)$. One of the elementary motivic complexes are $\mathbb{Z}(q)$ for $q \geq 1$, defined by the class of

$\mathbb{Z}(q) = C_*\mathbb{Z}_{tr}(\mathbb{G}_m^{\wedge q})[-q]$

For an abelian group $A$, such as $\mathbb{Z}/\ell$, there is a motivic complex $A(q) = \mathbb{Z}(q) \otimes A$. These give the motivic cohomology groups defined by

$H^{p,q}(X,\mathbb{Z}) = \mathbb{H}_{Zar}^p(X,\mathbb{Z}(q))$

since the motivic complexes $\mathbb{Z}(q)$ restrict to a complex of Zariksi sheaves of $X$. These are called the $p$-th motivic cohomology groups of weight $q$. They can also be extended to any abelian group $A$,

$H^{p,q}(X,A) = \mathbb{H}_{Zar}^p(X,A(q))$

giving motivic cohomology with coefficients in $A$ of weight $q$.

=== Special cases ===
There are a few special cases which can be analyzed explicitly. Namely, when $q = 0,1$. These results can be found in the fourth lecture of the Clay Math book.

==== Z(0) ====
In this case, $\mathbb{Z}(0) \cong \mathbb{Z}_{tr}(\mathbb{G}_m^{\wedge 0})$ which is quasi-isomorphic to $\mathbb{Z}$ (top of page 17), hence the weight $0$ cohomology groups are isomorphic to

$$H^{p,0}(X,\mathbb{Z}) = \begin{cases}
\mathbb{Z}(X) & \text{if } p = 0 \\
0 & \text{otherwise}
\end{cases}$$

where $\mathbb{Z}(X) = \text{Hom}_{Cor}(X,\text{Spec}(k))$. Since an open cover

==== Z(1) ====
This case requires more work, but the end result is a quasi-isomorphism between $\mathbb{Z}(1)$ and $\mathcal{O}^*[-1]$. This gives the two motivic cohomology groups

$$\begin{align}
H^{1,1}(X,\mathbb{Z}) &= H^0_{Zar}(X,\mathcal{O}^*) = \mathcal{O}^*(X) \\
H^{2,1}(X,\mathbb{Z}) &= H^1_{Zar}(X,\mathcal{O}^*) = \text{Pic}(X)
\end{align}$$

where the middle cohomology groups are Zariski cohomology.

=== General case: Z(n) ===
In general, over a perfect field $k$, there is a nice description of $\mathbb{Z}(n)$ in terms of presheaves with transfer $\mathbb{Z}_{tr}(\mathbb{P}^n)$. There is a quasi-ismorphism

$C_*(\mathbb{Z}_{tr}(\mathbb{P}^n) / \mathbb{Z}_{tr}(\mathbb{P}^{n-1})) \simeq C_*\mathbb{Z}_{tr}(\mathbb{G}_m^{\wedge q})[n]$

hence

$\mathbb{Z}(n) \simeq C_{*}(\mathbb {Z} _{tr}(\mathbb {P} ^{n})/\mathbb {Z} _{tr}(\mathbb {P} ^{n-1}))[-2n]$

which is found using splitting techniques along with a series of quasi-isomorphisms. The details are in lecture 15 of the Clay Math book.

== See also ==
- Relative cycle
- Motivic cohomology
- Mixed motives (math)
- Étale topology
- Nisnevich topology
