= Relative cycle =

In algebraic geometry, a relative cycle is a type of algebraic cycle on a scheme. In particular, let $X$ be a scheme of finite type over a Noetherian scheme $S$, so that $X \rightarrow S$. Then a relative cycle is a cycle on $X$ which lies over the generic points of $S$, such that the cycle has a well-defined specialization to any fiber of the projection $X \rightarrow S$.(Voevodsky & Suslin 2000)

The notion was introduced by Andrei Suslin and Vladimir Voevodsky in 2000; the authors were motivated to overcome some of the deficiencies of sheaves with transfers.
