= Correspondence (algebraic geometry) =

In algebraic geometry, a correspondence between algebraic varieties V and W is a subset R of V×W, that is closed in the Zariski topology. In set theory, a subset of a Cartesian product of two sets is called a binary relation or correspondence; thus, a correspondence here is a relation that is defined by algebraic equations. There are some important examples, even when V and W are algebraic curves: for example the Hecke operators of modular form theory may be considered as correspondences of modular curves.

However, the definition of a correspondence in algebraic geometry is not completely standard. For instance, Fulton, in his book on intersection theory, uses the definition above. In literature, however, a correspondence from a variety X to a variety Y is often taken to be a subset Z of X×Y such that Z is finite and surjective over each component of X. Note the asymmetry in this latter definition; which talks about a correspondence from X to Y rather than a correspondence between X and Y. The typical example of the latter kind of correspondence is the graph of a function f:X→Y. Correspondences also play an important role in the construction of motives (cf. presheaf with transfers).

== See also ==
- Adequate equivalence relation
