= David J. Simms =

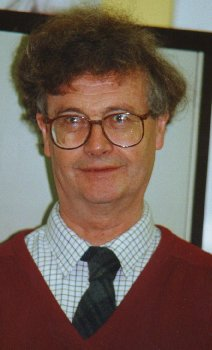
- David Simms in 1998
- Born: 13 January 1933; Sankeshwar, India
- Died: 24 June 2018 (aged 85); Dublin, Ireland
- Education: Trinity College Dublin; Peterhouse, Cambridge
- Scientific career
- Fields: Mathematics
- Workplaces: Trinity College Dublin
- Academic advisors: W. V. D. Hodge

David John Simms (13 January 1933 – 24 June 2018) was an Indian-born Irish mathematician who was a Fellow Emeritus and former Associate Professor of Mathematics at Trinity College, Dublin. Born in Sankeshwar, Mysore (the state now known as Karnataka), India, he specialized in differential geometry and geometric quantisation. He was a member of the Royal Irish Academy from 1978 and was a member of the Editorial Board of the journal Mathematical Proceedings of the Royal Irish Academy.

== Academic career ==
Simms completed his undergraduate degree in Mathematics in Trinity College Dublin, graduating in 1955. He was elected a Scholar of the College in 1952, when he was just in the first year of his degree, a notable achievement. He went on to do a Ph.D. in the University of Cambridge under W. V. D. Hodge. Simms lectured in Glasgow University before returning to Trinity. He served as head of the Department of Pure and Applied Mathematics from 1991 to 1998.

Simms' research interests included differential geometry and geometric quantisation.

=== Books and select publications ===
- Lie Groups and Quantum Mechanics, Springer Lecture Notes in Mathematics Number 52, 1968
- Lectures on Geometric Quantization, (with N.M.J. Woodhouse) Springer Lecture Notes in Physics Number 53, 1976 professional papers.
- Geometric quantization of energy levels in the Kepler problem, D.J. Simms - Symposia Mathematica, 1974

David Simms was a member of the Royal Irish Academy since 1978. He was a member of the Editorial Board of the journal Mathematical Proceedings of the Royal Irish Academy.

== Personal life ==
Simms was married to Anngret Erichson, a former associate professor and head of geography at University College Dublin. They had three sons, one of whom, Brendan Simms, is a professor of international relations at Cambridge University. As a child Simms survived 13 days at sea following the sinking of the SS City of Cairo in November 1942. He was also the nephew of Irish communist Brian Goold-Verschoyle. He was also the nephew of Archbishop George Otto Simms.

Simms died on 25 June 2018 in Dublin.
