= Motivic sheaf =

In mathematics, a motivic sheaf is a motivic-cohomology counterpart of an l-adic sheaf. It was first introduced by Morel and Voevodsky and was later developed by J. Ayoub, Deniz-Charles Cisinski, F. Déglise, F. Morel, and others. For Nori motives, the first construction is due to D. Arapura. In practice, a motivic sheaf is sometimes used instead of an l-adic sheaf because the former’s cycle-theoretic nature may be important. In the language of Ayoub,

ℓ-adic sheaves are a “transcendental” invariant: they have strong finiteness properties, behave well in families, and are relatively computable; but their relationship to algebraic cycles is tenuous (highly conjectural at best). By contrast, motivic cohomology is what Ayoub calls an “algebro-geometric invariant”, which is built directly out of objects of interest in algebraic geometry (e.g., algebraic cycles), but behaves “chaotically”: it does not have good finiteness properties, it varies violently in families, and it is not amenable to computation.
