= Adequate equivalence relation =

In algebraic geometry, a branch of mathematics, an adequate equivalence relation is an equivalence relation on algebraic cycles of smooth projective varieties used to obtain a well-working theory of such cycles, and in particular, well-defined intersection products. Pierre Samuel formalized the concept of an adequate equivalence relation in 1958. Since then it has become central to theory of motives. For every adequate equivalence relation, one may define the category of pure motives with respect to that relation.

Possible (and useful) adequate equivalence relations include rational, algebraic, homological and numerical equivalence. They are called "adequate" because dividing out by the equivalence relation is functorial, i.e. push-forward (with change of codimension) and pull-back of cycles is well-defined. Codimension 1 cycles modulo rational equivalence form the classical group of divisors modulo linear equivalence. All cycles modulo rational equivalence form the Chow ring.

== Definition ==
Let Z^{*}(X) := Z[X] be the free abelian group on the algebraic cycles of X. Then an adequate equivalence relation is a family of equivalence relations, ~_{X} on Z^{*}(X), one for each smooth projective variety X, satisfying the following three conditions:

1. (Linearity) The equivalence relation is compatible with addition of cycles.
2. (Moving lemma) If $\alpha, \beta \in Z^{*}(X)$ are cycles on X, then there exists a cycle $\alpha' \in Z^{*}(X)$ such that $\alpha$ ~_{X} $\alpha'$ and $\alpha'$ intersects $\beta$ properly.
3. (Push-forwards) Let $\alpha \in Z^{*}(X)$ and $\beta \in Z^{*}(X \times Y)$ be cycles such that $\beta$ intersects $\alpha \times Y$ properly. If $\alpha$ ~_{X} 0, then $(\pi_Y)_{*}(\beta \cdot (\alpha \times Y))$ ~_{Y} 0, where $\pi_Y : X \times Y \to Y$ is the projection.

The push-forward cycle in the last axiom is often denoted

$$\beta(\alpha) := (\pi_Y)_{*}(\beta \cdot (\alpha \times Y))$$

If $\beta$ is the graph of a function, then this reduces to the push-forward of the function. The generalizations of functions from X to Y to cycles on X × Y are known as correspondences. The last axiom allows us to push forward cycles by a correspondence.

== Examples of equivalence relations ==
The most common equivalence relations, listed from strongest to weakest, are gathered in the following table.

	definition	remarks
rational equivalence	Z ~_{rat} Z' if there is a cycle V on X × P^{1} flat over P^{1}, such that [V ∩ X × {0}] − [V ∩ X × {∞}] = [Z] − [Z' ].	the finest adequate equivalence relation (Lemma 3.2.2.1 in Yves André's book) "∩" denotes intersection in the cycle-theoretic sense (i.e. with multiplicities) and [.] denotes the cycle associated to a subscheme. see also Chow ring
algebraic equivalence	Z ~_{alg} Z′ if there is a curve C and a cycle V on X × C flat over C, such that [V ∩ X × {c}] − [V ∩ X × {d}] = [Z] − [Z' ] for two points c and d on the curve.	Strictly stronger than homological equivalence, as measured by the Griffiths group. See also Néron–Severi group.
smash-nilpotence equivalence	Z ~_{sn} Z′ if Z − Z′ is smash-nilpotent on X, that is, if $(Z - Z')^{\otimes n}$ ~_{rat} 0 on X^{n} for n >> 0.	introduced by Voevodsky in 1995.
homological equivalence	for a given Weil cohomology H, Z ~_{hom} Z′ if the image of the cycles under the cycle class map agrees	depends a priori of the choice of H, not assuming the standard conjecture D
numerical equivalence	Z ~_{num} Z′ if deg(Z ∩ T) = deg(Z′ ∩ T), where T is any cycle such that dimT = codimZ (The intersection is a linear combination of points and we add the intersection multiplicities at each point to get the degree.)	the coarsest equivalence relation (Exercise 3.2.7.2 in Yves André's book)
