= Lefschetz theorem on (1,1)-classes =

A Hodge conjecture in algebraic geometry

In algebraic geometry, a branch of mathematics, the Lefschetz theorem on (1,1)-classes, named after Solomon Lefschetz, is a classical statement relating holomorphic line bundles on a compact Kähler manifold to classes in its integral cohomology. It is the only case of the Hodge conjecture which has been proved for all Kähler manifolds.

== Statement of the theorem ==
Let X be a compact Kähler manifold. The first Chern class c_{1} gives a map from holomorphic line bundles to H^{2}(X, Z). By Hodge theory, the de Rham cohomology group H^{2}(X, C) decomposes as a direct sum H^{0,2}(X) ⊕ H^{1,1}(X) ⊕ H^{2,0}(X), and it can be proven that the image of c_{1} lies in H^{1,1}(X). The theorem says that the map to H^{2}(X, Z) ∩ H^{1,1}(X) is surjective.

In the special case where X is a projective variety, holomorphic line bundles are in bijection with linear equivalences class of divisors, and given a divisor D on X with associated line bundle O(D), the class c_{1}(O(D)) is Poincaré dual to the homology class given by D. Thus, this establishes the usual formulation of the Hodge conjecture for divisors in projective varieties.

== Proof using normal functions ==
Lefschetz's original proof worked on projective surfaces and used normal functions, which were introduced by Poincaré. Suppose that C_{t} is a pencil of curves on X. Each of these curves has a Jacobian variety JC_{t} (if a curve is singular, there is an appropriate generalized Jacobian variety). These can be assembled into a family $\mathcal{J}$, the Jacobian of the pencil, which comes with a projection map π to the base T of the pencil. A normal function is a (holomorphic) section of π.

Fix an embedding of X in P^{N}, and choose a pencil of curves C_{t} on X. For a fixed curve Γ on X, the intersection of Γ and C_{t} is a divisor p_{1}(t) + ... + p_{d}(t) on C_{t}, where d is the degree of X. Fix a base point p_{0} of the pencil. Then the divisor p_{1}(t) + ... + p_{d}(t) − dp_{0} is a divisor of degree zero, and consequently it determines a class ν_{Γ}(t) in the Jacobian JC_{t} for all t. The map from t to ν_{Γ}(t) is a normal function.

Henri Poincaré proved that for a general pencil of curves, all normal functions arose as ν_{Γ}(t) for some choice of Γ. Lefschetz proved that any normal function determined a class in H^{2}(X, Z) and that the class of ν_{Γ} is the fundamental class of Γ. Furthermore, he proved that a class in H^{2}(X, Z) is the class of a normal function if and only if it lies in H^{1,1}. Together with Poincaré's existence theorem, this proves the theorem on (1,1)-classes.

== Proof using sheaf cohomology ==
Because X is a complex manifold, it admits an exponential sheaf sequence

$$0 \to \underline{\mathbf{Z}} \stackrel{2\pi i}{\longrightarrow} \mathcal{O}_X \stackrel{\operatorname{exp}}{\longrightarrow} \mathcal{O}_X^\times \to 0.$$

Taking sheaf cohomology of this exact sequence gives maps

$$H^1(X, \mathcal{O}_X^\times) \stackrel{c_1}{\to} H^2(X, \mathbf{Z}) \stackrel{i_*}{\to} H^2(X, \mathcal{O}_X).$$

The group Pic X of line bundles on X is isomorphic to $H^1(X, \mathcal{O}_X^\times)$. The first Chern class map is c_{1} by definition, so it suffices to show that $i_*$ is zero on H^{2}(X, Z) ∩ H^{1,1}(X).

Because X is Kähler, Hodge theory implies that $H^2(X, \mathcal{O}_X) \cong H^{0,2}(X)$. However, $i_*$ factors through the map from H^{2}(X, Z) to H^{2}(X, C), and on H^{2}(X, C), $i_*$ is the restriction of the projection onto H^{0,2}(X). It follows that it is zero on H^{2}(X, Z) ∩ H^{1,1}(X), and consequently that the cycle class map is surjective.

== Bibliography ==
- Griffiths, Phillip; Harris, Joseph (1994), Principles of algebraic geometry, Wiley Classics Library, New York: John Wiley & Sons, doi:10.1002/9781118032527, ISBN 978-0-471-05059-9, MR 1288523
- Lefschetz, Solomon (1924), L'Analysis situs et la géométrie algébrique, Collection de Monographies publiée sous la Direction de M. Émile Borel (in French), Paris: Gauthier-Villars Reprinted in Lefschetz, Solomon (1971), Selected papers, New York: Chelsea Publishing Co., ISBN 978-0-8284-0234-7, MR 0299447
