= Hodge conjecture =

Unsolved problem in geometry

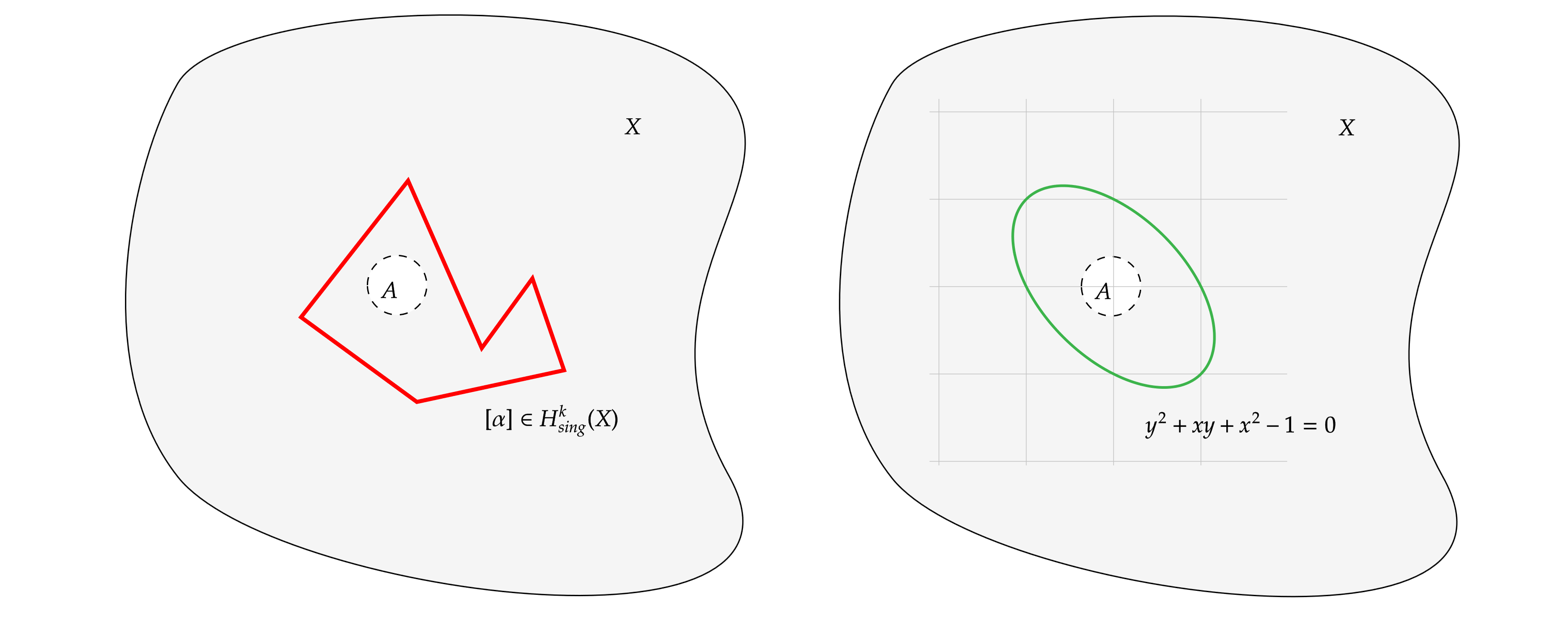
Topological features of a space $X$, such as a hole (labelled by $A$) are usually detected using singular (co)homology, where the presence of a non-zero class $[\alpha]\in H_\text{sing}^k(X)$ indicates the space $X$ has a (dimension $k$) hole. Such a class is represented by a (co)chain of simplices, depicted by the red polygon built out of 1-simplices (line segments) on the left. This class detects the hole $A$ by looping around it. In this case, there is in fact a polynomial equation whose zero set, depicted in green on the right, also detects the hole by looping around it. The Hodge conjecture generalises this statement to higher dimensions.

In mathematics, the Hodge conjecture is a major unsolved problem in algebraic geometry and complex geometry that relates the algebraic topology of a non-singular complex algebraic variety to its subvarieties.

In simple terms, the Hodge conjecture asserts that the basic topological information like the number of holes in certain geometric spaces, complex algebraic varieties, can be understood by studying the possible nice shapes sitting inside those spaces, which look like zero sets of polynomial equations. The latter objects can be studied using algebra and the calculus of analytic functions, and this allows one to indirectly understand the broad shape and structure of often higher-dimensional spaces which cannot be otherwise easily visualized.

More specifically, the conjecture states that certain de Rham cohomology classes are algebraic; that is, they are sums of Poincaré duals of the homology classes of subvarieties. It was formulated by the Scottish mathematician William Vallance Douglas Hodge as a result of work in between 1930 and 1940 to enrich the description of de Rham cohomology to include extra structure that is present in the case of complex algebraic varieties. It received little attention before Hodge presented it in an address during the 1950 International Congress of Mathematicians, held in Cambridge, Massachusetts. The Hodge conjecture is one of the Clay Mathematics Institute's Millennium Prize Problems, with a prize of $1,000,000 US for whoever can prove or disprove the Hodge conjecture.

== Motivation ==
Let X be a compact complex manifold of complex dimension n. Then X is an orientable smooth manifold of real dimension $2n$, so its cohomology groups lie in degrees zero through $2n$. Assume X is a Kähler manifold, so that there is a decomposition on its cohomology with complex coefficients

$$H^n(X, \Complex) = \bigoplus_{p+q=n} H^{p,q}(X),$$

where $H^{p,q}(X)$ is the subgroup of cohomology classes which are represented by harmonic forms of type $(p,q)$. That is, these are the cohomology classes represented by differential forms which, in some choice of local coordinates $z_1, \ldots, z_n$, can be written as a harmonic function times

$$dz_{i_1} \wedge \cdots \wedge dz_{i_p} \wedge d\bar z_{j_1} \wedge \cdots \wedge d\bar z_{j_q}.$$

Since X is a compact oriented manifold, X has a fundamental class, and so X can be integrated over.

Let Z be a complex submanifold of X of dimension k, and let $i\colon Z\to X$ be the inclusion map. Choose a differential form $\alpha$ of type $(p,q)$. We can integrate $\alpha$ over Z using the pullback function $i^*\colon X\to Z$,

$$\int_Z i^*\alpha$$

To evaluate this integral, choose a point of Z and call it $z=(z_1, \ldots, z_k)$. The inclusion of Z in X means that we can choose a local basis on X and have $z_{k+1} = \cdots = z_n = 0$ (rank-nullity theorem). If $p>k$, then $\alpha$ must contain some $dz_i$ where $z_i$ pulls back to zero on Z. The same is true for $d\bar z_j$ if $q > k$. Consequently, $k\ge p, k\ge q$ implies $2k\ge p+q=n$, this integral is zero if $(p,q) \ne (k,k)$.

The Hodge conjecture then (loosely) asks:

Which cohomology classes in $H^{k,k}(X)$ come from complex subvarieties Z?

== Statement ==
Let

$$\operatorname{Hdg}^k(X) = H^{2k}(X, \Q) \cap H^{k,k}(X).$$

We call this the group of Hodge classes of degree 2k on X.

The modern statement of the Hodge conjecture is

Hodge conjecture. Let X be a non-singular complex projective manifold. Then every Hodge class on X is a linear combination with rational coefficients of the cohomology classes of complex subvarieties of X.

A projective complex manifold is a complex manifold which can be embedded in complex projective space. Because projective space carries a Kähler metric, the Fubini–Study metric, such a manifold is always a Kähler manifold. By Chow's theorem, a projective complex manifold is also a smooth projective algebraic variety, that is, it is the zero set of a collection of homogeneous polynomials.

=== Reformulation in terms of algebraic cycles ===
Another way of phrasing the Hodge conjecture involves the idea of an algebraic cycle. An algebraic cycle on X is a formal combination of subvarieties of X; that is, it is something of the form

$$\sum_i c_iZ_i.$$

The coefficients are usually taken to be integral or rational. We define the cohomology class of an algebraic cycle to be the sum of the cohomology classes of its components. This is an example of the cycle class map of de Rham cohomology, see Weil cohomology. For example, the cohomology class of the above cycle would be

$$\sum_i c_i[Z_i].$$

Such a cohomology class is called algebraic. With this notation, the Hodge conjecture becomes

Let X be a projective complex manifold. Then every Hodge class on X is algebraic.

The assumption in the Hodge conjecture that X be algebraic (projective complex manifold) cannot be weakened. In 1977, Steven Zucker showed that it is possible to construct a counterexample to the Hodge conjecture as complex tori with analytic rational cohomology of type $(p,p)$, which is not projective algebraic. (see appendix B of Zucker (1977))

== Known cases ==
=== Low dimension and codimension ===
The first result on the Hodge conjecture is due to Lefschetz (1924). In fact, it predates the conjecture and provided some of Hodge's motivation.

Theorem (Lefschetz theorem on (1,1)-classes) Any element of $H^2(X,\Z)\cap H^{1,1}(X)$ is the cohomology class of a divisor on $X$. In particular, the Hodge conjecture is true for $H^2$.

A very quick proof can be given using sheaf cohomology and the exponential exact sequence. (The cohomology class of a divisor turns out to be equal to its first Chern class.) Lefschetz's original proof proceeded by normal functions, which were introduced by Henri Poincaré. However, the Griffiths transversality theorem shows that this approach cannot prove the Hodge conjecture for higher codimensional subvarieties.

By the hard Lefschetz theorem, one can prove:

Theorem. If for some $p < \frac{n}{2}$ the Hodge conjecture holds for Hodge classes of degree $p$, then the Hodge conjecture holds for Hodge classes of degree $2n-p$.

Combining the above two theorems implies that Hodge conjecture is true for Hodge classes of degree $2n-2$. This proves the Hodge conjecture when $X$ has dimension at most three.

The Lefschetz theorem on (1,1)-classes also implies that if all Hodge classes are generated by the Hodge classes of divisors, then the Hodge conjecture is true:

Corollary. If the algebra $\operatorname{Hdg}^*(X) = \bigoplus\nolimits_k \operatorname{Hdg}^k(X)$ is generated by $\operatorname{Hdg}^1(X)$, then the Hodge conjecture holds for $X$.

=== Hypersurfaces ===
By the strong and weak Lefschetz theorem, the only non-trivial part of the Hodge conjecture for hypersurfaces is the degree m part (i.e., the middle cohomology) of a 2m-dimensional hypersurface $X \subset \mathbf P^{2m+1}$. If the degree d is 2, i.e., X is a quadric, the Hodge conjecture holds for all m. For $m = 2$, i.e., fourfolds, the Hodge conjecture is known for $d \le 5$.

=== Abelian varieties ===
For most abelian varieties, the algebra Hdg*(X) is generated in degree one, so the Hodge conjecture holds. In particular, the Hodge conjecture holds for sufficiently general abelian varieties, for products of elliptic curves, and for simple abelian varieties of prime dimension. However, Mumford (1969) constructed an example of an abelian variety where Hdg^{2}(X) is not generated by products of divisor classes. Weil (1977) generalized this example by showing that whenever the variety has complex multiplication by an imaginary quadratic field, then Hdg^{2}(X) is not generated by products of divisor classes. Moonen & Zarhin (1999) proved that in dimension less than 5, either Hdg*(X) is generated in degree one, or the variety has complex multiplication by an imaginary quadratic field. In the latter case, the Hodge conjecture is only known in special cases.

== Generalizations ==
=== Integral Hodge conjecture ===
Hodge's original conjecture was:

Integral Hodge conjecture. Let X be a projective complex manifold. Then every cohomology class in $H^{2k}(X, \Z) \cap H^{k,k}(X)$ is the cohomology class of an algebraic cycle with integral coefficients on X.

This is now known to be false. The first counterexample was constructed by Atiyah & Hirzebruch (1961). Using K-theory, they constructed an example of a torsion cohomology class—that is, a cohomology class α such that nα = 0 for some positive integer n—which is not the class of an algebraic cycle. Such a class is necessarily a Hodge class. Totaro (1997) reinterpreted their result in the framework of cobordism and found many examples of such classes.

The simplest adjustment of the integral Hodge conjecture is:

Integral Hodge conjecture modulo torsion. Let X be a projective complex manifold. Then every cohomology class in $H^{2k}(X, \Z) \cap H^{k,k}(X)$ is the sum of a torsion class and the cohomology class of an algebraic cycle with integral coefficients on X.

Equivalently, after dividing $H^{2k}(X, \Z) \cap H^{k,k}(X)$ by torsion classes, every class is the image of the cohomology class of an integral algebraic cycle. This is also false. Kollár (1992) found an example of a Hodge class α which is not algebraic, but which has an integral multiple which is algebraic.

Rosenschon & Srinivas (2016) have shown that in order to obtain a correct integral Hodge conjecture, one needs to replace Chow groups, which can also be expressed as motivic cohomology groups, by a variant known as étale (or Lichtenbaum) motivic cohomology. They show that the rational Hodge conjecture is equivalent to an integral Hodge conjecture for this modified motivic cohomology.

=== Hodge conjecture for Kähler varieties ===
A natural generalization of the Hodge conjecture would ask:

Hodge conjecture for Kähler varieties, naive version. Let X be a complex Kähler manifold. Then every Hodge class on X is a linear combination with rational coefficients of the cohomology classes of complex subvarieties of X.

This is too optimistic, because there are not enough subvarieties to make this work. A possible substitute is to ask instead one of the two following questions:

Hodge conjecture for Kähler varieties, vector bundle version. Let X be a complex Kähler manifold. Then every Hodge class on X is a linear combination with rational coefficients of Chern classes of vector bundles on X.
Hodge conjecture for Kähler varieties, coherent sheaf version. Let X be a complex Kähler manifold. Then every Hodge class on X is a linear combination with rational coefficients of Chern classes of coherent sheaves on X.

Voisin (2002) proved that the Chern classes of coherent sheaves give strictly more Hodge classes than the Chern classes of vector bundles and that the Chern classes of coherent sheaves are insufficient to generate all the Hodge classes. Consequently, the only known formulations of the Hodge conjecture for Kähler varieties are false.

=== Generalized Hodge conjecture ===
Hodge made an additional, stronger conjecture than the integral Hodge conjecture. Say that a cohomology class on X is of co-level c (coniveau c) if it is the pushforward of a cohomology class on a c-codimensional subvariety of X. The cohomology classes of co-level at least c filter the cohomology of X, and it is easy to see that the cth step of the filtration N^{c}H^{k}(X, Z) satisfies

$$N^cH^k(X, \mathbf{Z}) \subseteq H^k(X, \mathbf{Z}) \cap (H^{k-c,c}(X) \oplus\cdots\oplus H^{c,k-c}(X)).$$

Hodge's original statement was:

Generalized Hodge conjecture, Hodge's version. $N^cH^k(X, \mathbf{Z}) = H^k(X, \mathbf{Z}) \cap (H^{k-c,c}(X) \oplus\cdots\oplus H^{c,k-c}(X)).$

Grothendieck (1969) observed that this cannot be true, even with rational coefficients, because the right-hand side is not always a Hodge structure. His corrected form of the Hodge conjecture is:

Generalized Hodge conjecture. N^{c}H^{k}(X, Q) is the largest sub-Hodge structure of H^{k}(X, Q) contained in $H^{k-c,c}(X) \oplus\cdots\oplus H^{c,k-c}(X).$

This version is open.

== Algebraicity of Hodge loci ==
The strongest evidence in favor of the Hodge conjecture is the algebraicity result of Cattani, Deligne & Kaplan (1995). Suppose that we vary the complex structure of X over a simply connected base. Then the topological cohomology of X does not change, but the Hodge decomposition does change. It is known that if the Hodge conjecture is true, then the locus of all points on the base where the cohomology of a fiber is a Hodge class is in fact an algebraic subset, that is, it is cut out by polynomial equations. Cattani, Deligne & Kaplan (1995) proved that this is always true, without assuming the Hodge conjecture.

== See also ==
- Tate conjecture
- Hodge theory
- Hodge structure
- Period mapping
