= Glossary of field theory =

Field theory is the branch of algebra that studies fields

Field theory is the branch of mathematics in which fields are studied.

In mathematics, a field is a set on which addition, subtraction, multiplication, and division are defined and behave as the corresponding operations on rational numbers do. A field is thus a fundamental algebraic structure that is widely used in algebra, number theory, and many other areas of mathematics.

This is a glossary of some terms of the subject. (See field theory (physics) for the unrelated field theories in physics.)

== Definition of a field ==
A field is a commutative ring (F, +, *) in which 0 ≠ 1 and every nonzero element has a multiplicative inverse. In a field we thus can perform the operations addition, subtraction, multiplication, and division.

The non-zero elements of a field F form an abelian group under multiplication; this group is typically denoted by F^{×};

The ring of polynomials in the variable x with coefficients in F is denoted by F[x].

== Basic definitions ==
Characteristic
The characteristic of the field F is the smallest positive integer n such that n·1 = 0; here n·1 stands for n summands 1 + 1 + 1 + ... + 1. If no such n exists, we say the characteristic is zero. Every non-zero characteristic is a prime number. For example, the rational numbers, the real numbers and the p-adic numbers have characteristic 0, while the finite field Z_{p} with p being prime has characteristic p.
Subfield
A subfield of a field F is a subset of F which is closed under the field operation + and * of F and which, with these operations, forms itself a field.
Prime field
The prime field of the field F is the unique smallest subfield of F.
Extension field
If F is a subfield of E then E is an extension field of F. We then also say that E/F is a field extension.
Degree of an extension
Given an extension E/F, the field E can be considered as a vector space over the field F, and the dimension of this vector space is the degree of the extension, denoted by [E : F].
Finite extension
A finite extension is a field extension whose degree is finite.
Algebraic extension
If an element α of an extension field E over F is the root of a non-zero polynomial in F[x], then α is algebraic over F. If every element of E is algebraic over F, then E/F is an algebraic extension.
Generating set
Given a field extension E/F and a subset S of E, we write F(S) for the smallest subfield of E that contains both F and S. It consists of all the elements of E that can be obtained by repeatedly using the operations +, −, *, / on the elements of F and S. If E = F(S), we say that E is generated by S over F.
Primitive element
An element α of an extension field E over a field F is called a primitive element if E=F(α), the smallest extension field containing α. Such an extension is called a simple extension.
Splitting field
A field extension generated by the complete factorisation of a polynomial.
Normal extension
A field extension generated by the complete factorisation of a set of polynomials.
Separable extension
An extension generated by roots of separable polynomials.
Perfect field
A field such that every finite extension is separable. All fields of characteristic zero, and all finite fields, are perfect.
Imperfect degree
Let F be a field of characteristic p > 0; then F^{p} is a subfield. The degree [F : F^{p}] is called the imperfect degree of F. The field F is perfect if and only if its imperfect degree is 1. For example, if F is a function field of n variables over a finite field of characteristic p > 0, then its imperfect degree is p^{n}.
Algebraically closed field
A field F is algebraically closed if every polynomial in F[x] has a root in F; equivalently: every polynomial in F[x] is a product of linear factors.
Algebraic closure
An algebraic closure of a field F is an algebraic extension of F which is algebraically closed. Every field has an algebraic closure, and it is unique up to an isomorphism that fixes F.
Transcendental
Those elements of an extension field of F that are not algebraic over F are transcendental over F.
Algebraically independent elements
Elements of an extension field of F are algebraically independent over F if they don't satisfy any non-zero polynomial equation with coefficients in F.
Transcendence degree
The number of algebraically independent transcendental elements in a field extension. It is used to define the dimension of an algebraic variety.

== Homomorphisms ==
Field homomorphism
A field homomorphism between two fields E and F is a ring homomorphism, i.e., a function

f : E → F

such that, for all x, y in E,

f(x + y) = f(x) + f(y)
f(xy) = f(x) f(y)
f(1) = 1.

For fields E and F, these properties imply that f(0) = 0, f(x^{−1}) = f(x)^{−1} for x in E^{×}, and that f is injective. Fields, together with these homomorphisms, form a category. Two fields E and F are called isomorphic if there exists a bijective homomorphism

f : E → F.

The two fields are then identical for all practical purposes; however, not necessarily in a unique way. See, for example, Complex conjugate.

== Types of fields ==
Finite field
A field with finitely many elements, a.k.a. Galois field.
Ordered field
A field with a total order compatible with its operations.
Rational numbers
Real numbers
Complex numbers
Number field
Finite extension of the field of rational numbers.
Algebraic numbers
The field of algebraic numbers is the smallest algebraically closed extension of the field of rational numbers. Their detailed properties are studied in algebraic number theory.
Quadratic field
A degree-two extension of the rational numbers.
Cyclotomic field
An extension of the rational numbers generated by a root of unity.
Totally real field
A number field generated by a root of a polynomial, having all its roots real numbers.
Formally real field
Real closed field
Global field
A number field or a function field of one variable over a finite field.
Local field
A completion of some global field (w.r.t. a prime of the integer ring).
Complete field
A field complete w.r.t. some valuation.
Pseudo algebraically closed field
A field in which every variety has a rational point.
Henselian field
A field satisfying Hensel lemma w.r.t. some valuation. A generalization of complete fields.
Hilbertian field
A field satisfying Hilbert's irreducibility theorem: formally, one for which the projective line is not thin in the sense of Serre.
Kroneckerian field
A totally real algebraic number field or a totally imaginary quadratic extension of a totally real field.
CM-field or J-field
An algebraic number field which is a totally imaginary quadratic extension of a totally real field.
Linked field
A field over which no biquaternion algebra is a division algebra.
Frobenius field
A pseudo algebraically closed field whose absolute Galois group has the embedding property.

== Field extensions ==
Let E/F be a field extension.

Algebraic extension
An extension in which every element of E is algebraic over F.
Simple extension
An extension which is generated by a single element, called a primitive element, or generating element. The primitive element theorem classifies such extensions.
Normal extension
An extension that splits a family of polynomials: every root of the minimal polynomial of an element of E over F is also in E.
Separable extension
An algebraic extension in which the minimal polynomial of every element of E over F is a separable polynomial, that is, has distinct roots.
Galois extension
A normal, separable field extension.
Primary extension
An extension E/F such that the algebraic closure of F in E is purely inseparable over F; equivalently, E is linearly disjoint from the separable closure of F.
Purely transcendental extension
An extension E/F in which every element of E not in F is transcendental over F.
Regular extension
An extension E/F such that E is separable over F and F is algebraically closed in E.
Simple radical extension
A simple extension E/F generated by a single element α satisfying α^{n} = b for an element b of F. In characteristic p, we also take an extension by a root of an Artin–Schreier polynomial to be a simple radical extension.
Radical extension
A tower F = F_{0} < F_{1} < ⋅⋅⋅ < F_{k} = E where each extension F_{i} / F_{i−1} is a simple radical extension.
Self-regular extension
An extension E/F such that E ⊗_{F} E is an integral domain.
Totally transcendental extension
An extension E/F such that F is algebraically closed in F.
Distinguished class
A class C of field extensions with the three properties
1. If E is a C-extension of F and F is a C-extension of K then E is a C-extension of K.
2. If E and F are C-extensions of K in a common overfield M, then the compositum EF is a C-extension of K.
3. If E is a C-extension of F and E > K > F then E is a C-extension of K.

== Galois theory ==
Galois extension
A normal, separable field extension.
Galois group
The automorphism group of a Galois extension. When it is a finite extension, this is a finite group of order equal to the degree of the extension. Galois groups for infinite extensions are profinite groups.
Kummer theory
The Galois theory of taking nth roots, given enough roots of unity. It includes the general theory of quadratic extensions.
Artin–Schreier theory
Covers an exceptional case of Kummer theory, in characteristic p.
Normal basis
A basis in the vector space sense of L over K, on which the Galois group of L over K acts transitively.
Tensor product of fields
A different foundational piece of algebra, including the compositum operation (join of fields).

== Extensions of Galois theory ==
Inverse problem of Galois theory
Given a group G, find an extension of the rational number or other field with G as Galois group.
Differential Galois theory
The subject in which symmetry groups of differential equations are studied along the lines traditional in Galois theory. This is actually an old idea, and one of the motivations when Sophus Lie founded the theory of Lie groups. It has not, probably, reached definitive form.
Grothendieck's Galois theory
A very abstract approach from algebraic geometry, introduced to study the analogue of the fundamental group.
