= Artin conjecture =

In mathematics, there are several conjectures made by Emil Artin:

- Artin conjecture (L-functions)
- Artin's conjecture on primitive roots
- The (now proved) conjecture that finite fields are quasi-algebraically closed; see Chevalley–Warning theorem
- The (now disproved) conjecture that any algebraic form over the p-adics of degree d in more than d^{2} variables represents zero: that is, that all p-adic fields are C_{2}; see Ax–Kochen theorem or Brauer's theorem on forms
- Artin had also conjectured Hasse's theorem on elliptic curves
