= Dual basis in a field extension =

In mathematics, the linear algebra concept of dual basis can be applied in the context of a finite field extension L/K, by using the field trace. This requires the property that the field trace Tr_{L/K} provides a non-degenerate quadratic form over K. This is true if L is separable over K; it is always true if K is a perfect field, including when K is finite or of characteristic zero.

A dual basis is not a specific basis like the polynomial basis or the normal basis; rather for any given basis, it is another associated basis which is useful for computations.

We say that two bases of a finite field $L=\text{GF}(p^n)$ over $K = \text{GF}(p)=\Z/p\Z$,

$$B_1 = \{\alpha_0, \alpha_1, \ldots, \alpha_{n-1}\}, \qquad
B_2 = \{\beta_0, \beta_1, \ldots, \beta_{n-1}\},$$

are dual to each other provided

$$\operatorname{Tr}(\alpha_i\cdot \beta_j) = \begin{cases}
1 & \text{if }\ i = j \\
0 & \text{if }\ i\neq j.
\end{cases}$$

Here the trace of a value in GF(p^{m}) can be calculated as follows:

$$\operatorname{Tr}(\gamma ) = \sum_{i=0}^{n-1} \gamma^{p^i}$$

Using a dual basis can provide a way to easily communicate between devices that use different bases, rather than having to explicitly convert between bases using the change of bases formula. Furthermore, if a dual basis is implemented then conversion from an element in the original basis to the dual basis can be accomplished with multiplication by the multiplicative identity (usually 1).
