= Separability =

Separability may refer to:

== Mathematics ==
- Separable algebra, a generalization to associative algebras of the notion of a separable field extension
- Separable differential equation, in which separation of variables is achieved by various means
- Separable extension, in field theory, an algebraic field extension
- Separable filter, a product of two or more simple filters in image processing
- Separable ordinary differential equation, a class of equations that can be separated into a pair of integrals
- Separable partial differential equation, a class of equations that can be broken down into differential equations in fewer independent variables
- Separable permutation, a permutation that can be obtained by direct sums and skew sums of the trivial permutation
- Separable polynomial, a polynomial whose number of distinct roots is equal to its degree
- Separable sigma algebra, a separable space in measure theory
- Separable space, a topological space that contains a countable, dense subset
- Linear separability, a geometric property of a pair of sets of points in Euclidean geometry
- Recursively inseparable sets, in computability theory, pairs of sets of natural numbers that cannot be "separated" with a recursive set

== Other uses ==
- Separable states, in quantum mechanics, states without quantum entanglement
- Separation process, in chemistry, a method that converts a mixture of substances into two or more distinct product mixtures
