= Steinitz's theorem (disambiguation) =

Steinitz's theorem may refer to any of the following results by German mathematician Ernst Steinitz (1871–1928):

- Steinitz's theorem on the graphs of three-dimensional convex polyhedra
- Steinitz exchange lemma on bases of finite-dimensional vector spaces
- Lévy–Steinitz theorem on the convergence of rearranged infinite series of vectors
- Several variations of Carathéodory's theorem (convex hull) on the enclosure of points in the convex hulls of other points
- Steinitz's theorem (field theory) on simple extensions
- The existence and uniqueness up to (non-unique) isomorphism of an algebraic closure of any field
