= Lüroth's theorem =

Theorem in algebraic geometry

In mathematics, Lüroth's theorem asserts that every field that lies between a field K and the rational function field K(X) must be generated as an extension of K by a single element of K(X). This result is named after Jacob Lüroth, who proved it in 1876.

== Statement ==
Let $K$ be a field and $M$ be an intermediate field between $K$ and $K(X)$, for some indeterminate X. Then there exists a rational function $f(X)\in K(X)$ such that $M=K(f(X))$. In other words, every intermediate extension between $K$ and $K(X)$ is a simple extension.

== Proofs ==
The proof of Lüroth's theorem can be derived easily from the theory of rational curves, using the geometric genus. This method is non-elementary, but several short proofs using only the basics of field theory have long been known, mainly using the concept of transcendence degree. Many of these simple proofs use Gauss's lemma on primitive polynomials as a main step.

== See also ==
- Primitive element theorem — another theorem asserting that certain field extensions are simple
