= Quasi-algebraically closed field =

In mathematics, a field F is called quasi-algebraically closed (or C_{1}) if every non-constant homogeneous polynomial P over F has a non-trivial zero provided the number of its variables is more than its degree. The idea of quasi-algebraically closed fields was investigated by C. C. Tsen, a student of Emmy Noether, in a 1936 paper (Tsen 1936); and later by Serge Lang in his 1951 Princeton University dissertation and in his 1952 paper (Lang 1952). The idea itself is attributed to Lang's advisor Emil Artin.

Formally, if P is a non-constant homogeneous polynomial in variables

X_{1}, ..., X_{N},

and of degree d satisfying

d < N

then it has a non-trivial zero over F; that is, for some x_{i} in F, not all 0, we have

P(x_{1}, ..., x_{N}) = 0.

In geometric language, the hypersurface defined by P, in projective space of degree N − 2, then has a point over F.

== Examples ==
- Any algebraically closed field is quasi-algebraically closed. In fact, any homogeneous polynomial in at least two variables over an algebraically closed field has a non-trivial zero.
- Any finite field is quasi-algebraically closed by the Chevalley–Warning theorem.
- Algebraic function fields of dimension 1 over algebraically closed fields are quasi-algebraically closed by Tsen's theorem.
- The maximal unramified extension of a complete field with a discrete valuation and a perfect residue field is quasi-algebraically closed.
- A complete field with a discrete valuation and an algebraically closed residue field is quasi-algebraically closed by a result of Lang.
- A pseudo algebraically closed field of characteristic zero is quasi-algebraically closed.

== Properties ==
- Any algebraic extension of a quasi-algebraically closed field is quasi-algebraically closed.
- The Brauer group of a finite extension of a quasi-algebraically closed field is trivial.
- A quasi-algebraically closed field has cohomological dimension at most 1.

== C_{k} fields ==
Quasi-algebraically closed fields are also called C_{1}. A C_{k} field, more generally, is one for which any homogeneous polynomial of degree d in N variables has a non-trivial zero, provided

d^{k} < N,

for k ≥ 1. The condition was first introduced and studied by Lang. If a field is C_{i} then so is a finite extension. The C_{0} fields are precisely the algebraically closed fields.

Lang and Nagata proved that if a field is C_{k}, then any extension of transcendence degree n is C_{k+n}. The smallest k such that K is a C_{k} field ($\infty$ if no such number exists), is called the diophantine dimension dd(K) of K.

=== C_{1} fields ===
Every finite field is C_{1}.

=== C_{2} fields ===
==== Properties ====
Suppose that the field k is C_{2}.

- Any skew field D finite over k as centre has the property that the reduced norm D^{∗} → k^{∗} is surjective.
- Every quadratic form in 5 or more variables over k is isotropic.

==== Artin's conjecture ====
Artin conjectured that p-adic fields were C_{2}, but Guy Terjanian found p-adic counterexamples for all p. The Ax–Kochen theorem applied methods from model theory to show that Artin's conjecture was true for Q_{p} with p large enough (depending on d).

=== Weakly C_{k} fields ===
A field K is weakly C_{k,d} if for every homogeneous polynomial of degree d in N variables satisfying

d^{k} < N

the Zariski closed set V(f) of P^{n}(K) contains a subvariety which is Zariski closed over K.

A field that is weakly C_{k,d} for every d is weakly C_{k}.

==== Properties ====
- A C_{k} field is weakly C_{k}.
- A perfect PAC weakly C_{k} field is C_{k}.
- A field K is weakly C_{k,d} if and only if every form satisfying the conditions has a point x defined over a field which is a primary extension of K.
- If a field is weakly C_{k}, then any extension of transcendence degree n is weakly C_{k+n}.
- Any extension of an algebraically closed field is weakly C_{1}.
- Any field with procyclic absolute Galois group is weakly C_{1}.
- Any field of positive characteristic is weakly C_{2}.
- If the field of rational numbers $\mathbb{Q}$ and the function fields $\mathbb{F}_p(t)$ are weakly C_{1}, then every field is weakly C_{1}.

== See also ==
- Brauer's theorem on forms
- Tsen rank
