= Hyperfinite =

Hyperfinite may refer to:

- Hyperfinite set, a type of internal set in non-standard analysis
- Hyperfinite von Neumann algebra, also called amenable von Neumann algebras
  - Hyperfinite type II factor, a unique von Neumann algebra that is a factor of type II and also hyperfinite
- Hyper-finite field, an uncountable field similar in many ways to finite fields
- Uniformly hyperfinite algebra, a C*-algebra that can be written as the closure of an increasing union of finite-dimensional full matrix algebras
