= Ernst Steinitz =

German mathematician (1871–1928)

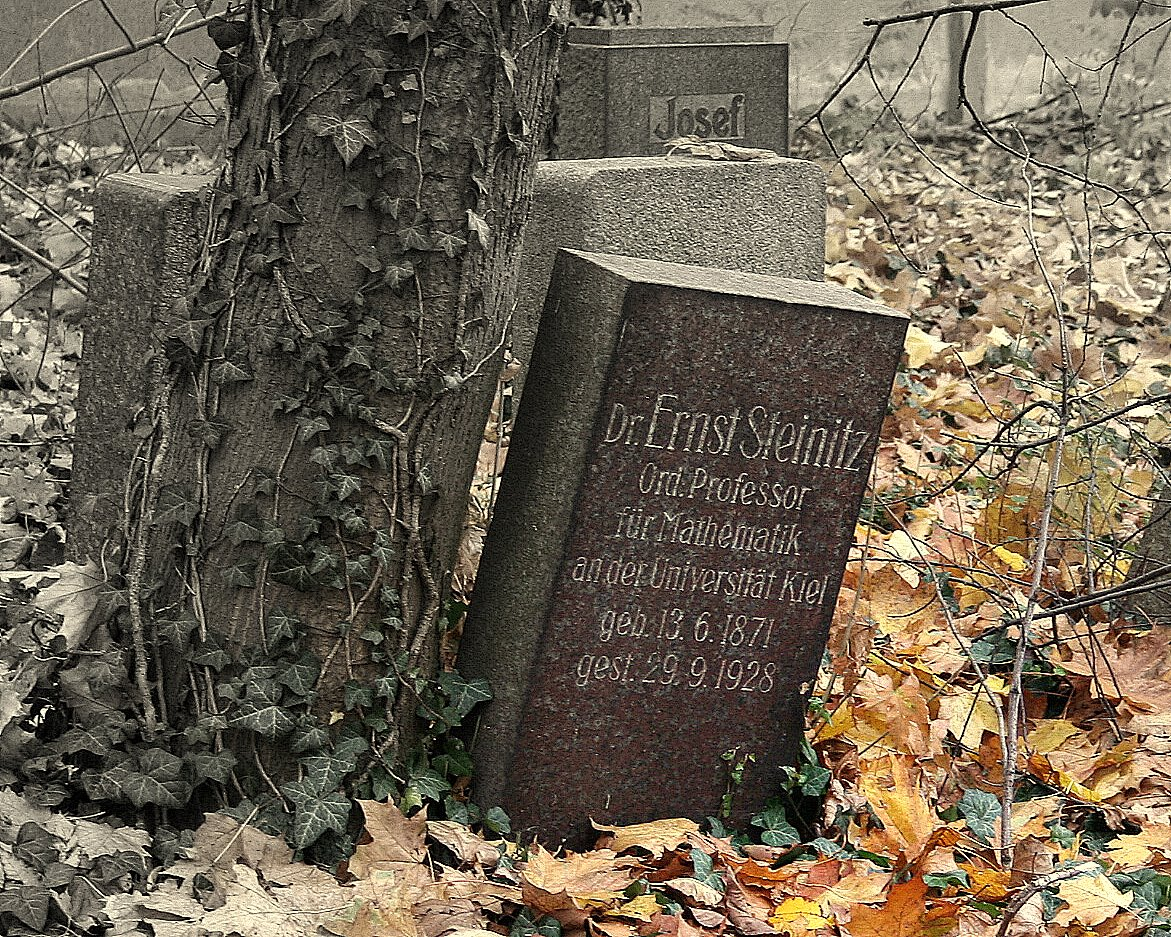
- Tombstone of Ernst Steinitz, Old Jewish Cemetery, Wrocław (street Lotnicza).
- Born: 13 June 1871; Laurahütte, Silesia, Germany
- Died: 29 September 1928 (aged 57); Kiel, Schleswig-Holstein, Germany
- Education: University of Breslau
- Scientific career
- Fields: Mathematics
- Workplaces: University of Kiel; Technische Universität Berlin
- Doctoral advisor: Jakob Rosanes

Ernst Steinitz (13 June 1871 – 29 September 1928) was a German mathematician.

== Biography ==
Steinitz was born in Laurahütte (Siemianowice Śląskie), Silesia, Germany (now in Poland), the son of Sigismund Steinitz, a Jewish coal merchant, and his wife Auguste Cohen; he had two brothers. He studied at the University of Breslau and the University of Berlin, receiving his Ph.D. from Breslau in 1894. Subsequently, he took positions at Charlottenburg (now Technische Universität Berlin), Breslau, and the University of Kiel, Germany, where he died in 1928. Steinitz married Martha Steinitz and had one son.

== Mathematical works ==
Steinitz's 1894 thesis was on the subject of projective configurations; it contained the result that any abstract description of an incidence structure of three lines per point and three points per line could be realized as a configuration of straight lines in the Euclidean plane with the possible exception of one of the lines. His thesis also contains the proof of Kőnig's theorem for regular bipartite graphs, phrased in the language of configurations.

In 1910 Steinitz published the very influential paper Algebraische Theorie der Körper (German: Algebraic Theory of Fields, Crelle's Journal). In this paper he axiomatically studies the properties of fields and defines important concepts like prime field, perfect field and the transcendence degree of a field extension, and also normal and separable extensions (the latter he called algebraic extensions of the first kind). Besides numerous, today standard, results in field theory, he proved that every field has an (essentially unique) algebraic closure and a theorem, which characterizes the existence of primitive elements of a field extension in terms of its intermediate fields. Bourbaki called this article "a basic paper which may be considered as having given rise to the current conception of Algebra".

Steinitz also made fundamental contributions to the theory of polyhedra: Steinitz's theorem for polyhedra is that the 1-skeletons of convex polyhedra are exactly the 3-connected planar graphs. His work in this area was published posthumously as a 1934 book, Vorlesungen über die Theorie der Polyeder unter Einschluss der Elemente der Topologie, by Hans Rademacher.

== See also ==
- Hall algebra
- Hauptvermutung
- Medial graph
- Steinitz class
- Steinitz exchange lemma
- Supernatural numbers
- Lévy–Steinitz theorem
