= Symmetric product of an algebraic curve =

In mathematics, the n-fold symmetric product of an algebraic curve C is the quotient space of the n-fold cartesian product

C × C × ... × C

or C^{n} by the group action of the symmetric group S_{n} on n letters permuting the factors. It exists as a smooth algebraic variety denoted by Σ^{n}C. If C is a compact Riemann surface, Σ^{n}C is therefore a complex manifold. Its interest in relation to the classical geometry of curves is that its points correspond to effective divisors on C of degree n, that is, formal sums of points with non-negative integer coefficients.

For C the projective line (say the Riemann sphere $\mathbb{C}$ ∪ {∞} ≈ S^{2}), its nth symmetric product Σ^{n}C can be identified with complex projective space $\mathbb{CP}^n$ of dimension n.

If G has genus g ≥ 1 then the Σ^{n}C are closely related to the Jacobian variety J of C. More accurately for n taking values up to g they form a sequence of approximations to J from below: their images in J under addition on J (see theta-divisor) have dimension n and fill up J, with some identifications caused by special divisors.

For g = n we have Σ^{g}C actually birationally equivalent to J; the Jacobian is a blowing down of the symmetric product. That means that at the level of function fields it is possible to construct J by taking linearly disjoint copies of the function field of C, and within their compositum taking the fixed subfield of the symmetric group. This is the source of André Weil's technique of constructing J as an abstract variety from 'birational data'. Other ways of constructing J, for example as a Picard variety, are preferred now but this does mean that for any rational function F on C

F(x_{1}) + ... + F(x_{g})

makes sense as a rational function on J, for the x_{i} staying away from the poles of F.

For n > g the mapping from Σ^{n}C to J by addition fibers it over J; when n is large enough (around twice g) this becomes a projective space bundle (the Picard bundle). It has been studied in detail, for example by Kempf and Mukai.

== Betti numbers and the Euler characteristic of the symmetric product ==
Let C be a smooth projective curve of genus g over the complex numbers C. The Betti numbers b_{i}(Σ^{n}C) of the symmetric products Σ^{n}C for all n = 0, 1, 2, ... are given by the generating function

$$\sum_{n = 0}^{\infty} \sum_{i = 0}^{2n} b_i( \Sigma^n C ) y^n u^{i-n} = \frac{ (1 + y)^{2g} }{ (1 - u y) (1 - u^{-1} y) }$$

and their Euler characteristics e(Σ^{n}C) are given by the generating function

$$\sum_{n = 0}^{\infty} e( \Sigma^n C ) p^n = (1 - p)^{2g - 2} .$$

Here we have set u = -1 and y = -p in the previous formula.
