= Separable algebra =

In mathematics, a separable algebra is a kind of semisimple algebra. It is a generalization to associative algebras of the notion of a separable field extension.

== Definition and first properties ==
A homomorphism of (unital, but not necessarily commutative) rings

$$K \to A$$

is called separable if the multiplication map

$$\begin{array}{rccc} \mu :& A \otimes_K A &\to& A \\
& a \otimes b &\mapsto & ab
\end{array}$$

admits a section

$$\sigma: A \to A \otimes_K A$$

that is a homomorphism of A-A-bimodules.

If the ring $K$ is commutative and $K \to A$ maps $K$ into the center of $A$, we call $A$ a separable algebra over $K$.

It is useful to describe separability in terms of the element

$$p := \sigma(1) = \sum a_i \otimes b_i \in A \otimes_K A$$

The reason is that a section σ is determined by this element. The condition that σ is a section of μ is equivalent to

$$\sum a_i b_i = 1$$

and the condition that σ is a homomorphism of A-A-bimodules is equivalent to the following requirement for any a in A:

$$\sum a a_i \otimes b_i = \sum a_i \otimes b_i a.$$

Such an element p is called a separability idempotent, since regarded as an element of the algebra $A \otimes A^{\rm op}$ it satisfies $p^2 = p$.

== Examples ==
For any commutative ring R, the (non-commutative) ring of n-by-n matrices $M_n(R)$ is a separable R-algebra. For any $1 \le j \le n$, a separability idempotent is given by $\sum_{i=1}^n e_{ij} \otimes e_{ji}$, where $e_{ij}$ denotes the elementary matrix which is 0 except for the entry in the (i, j) entry, which is 1. In particular, this shows that separability idempotents need not be unique. Indeed, they are not even unique up to automorphism.

=== Separable algebras over a field ===
A field extension L/K of finite degree is a separable extension if and only if L is separable as an associative K-algebra. If L/K has a primitive element $a$ with irreducible polynomial $p(x) = (x - a) \sum_{i=0}^{n-1} b_i x^i$, then a separability idempotent is given by $\sum_{i=0}^{n-1} a^i \otimes_K \frac{b_i}{p'(a)}$. The tensorands are dual bases for the trace map: if $\sigma_1,\ldots,\sigma_{n}$ are the distinct K-monomorphisms of L into an algebraic closure of K, the trace mapping Tr of L into K is defined by $Tr(x) = \sum_{i=1}^{n} \sigma_i(x)$. The trace map and its dual bases make explicit L as a Frobenius algebra over K.

More generally, separable algebras over a field K can be classified as follows: they are the same as finite products of matrix algebras over finite-dimensional division algebras whose centers are finite-dimensional separable field extensions of the field K. In particular: Every separable algebra is itself finite-dimensional. If K is a perfect field – for example a field of characteristic zero, or a finite field, or an algebraically closed field – then every extension of K is separable, so that separable K-algebras are finite products of matrix algebras over finite-dimensional division algebras over field K. In other words, if K is a perfect field, there is no difference between a separable algebra over K and a finite-dimensional semisimple algebra over K. It can be shown by a generalized theorem of Maschke that an associative K-algebra A is separable if for every field extension $L/K$ the algebra $A\otimes_K L$ is semisimple.

=== Group rings ===
If K is commutative ring and G is a finite group such that the order of G is invertible in K, then the group algebra K[G] is a separable K-algebra. A separability idempotent is given by $\frac{1}{o(G)} \sum_{g \in G} g \otimes g^{-1}$.

== Equivalent characterizations of separability ==
There are several equivalent definitions of separable algebras. A K-algebra A is separable if and only if it is projective when considered as a left module of $A^e$ in the usual way. Moreover, an algebra A is separable if and only if it is flat when considered as a right module of $A^e$ in the usual way.

Separable algebras can also be characterized by means of split extensions: A is separable over K if and only if all short exact sequences of A-A-bimodules that are split as A-K-bimodules also split as A-A-bimodules. Indeed, this condition is necessary since the multiplication mapping $\mu : A \otimes_K A \rightarrow A$ arising in the definition above is a A-A-bimodule epimorphism, which is split as an A-K-bimodule map by the right inverse mapping $A \rightarrow A \otimes_K A$ given by $a \mapsto a \otimes 1$. The converse can be proven by a judicious use of the separability idempotent (similarly to the proof of Maschke's theorem, applying its components within and without the splitting maps).

Equivalently, the relative Hochschild cohomology groups $H^n(R,S;M)$ of (R, S) in any coefficient bimodule M is zero for n > 0. Examples of separable extensions are many including first separable algebras where R is a separable algebra and S = 1 times the ground field. Any ring R with elements a and b satisfying ab = 1, but ba different from 1, is a separable extension over the subring S generated by 1 and bRa.

== Relation to Frobenius algebras ==
A separable algebra is said to be strongly separable if there exists a separability idempotent that is symmetric, meaning

$$e = \sum_{i=1}^n x_i \otimes y_i = \sum_{i=1}^n y_i \otimes x_i$$

An algebra is strongly separable if and only if its trace form is nondegenerate, thus making the algebra into a particular kind of Frobenius algebra called a symmetric algebra (not to be confused with the symmetric algebra arising as the quotient of the tensor algebra).

If K is commutative, A is a finitely generated projective separable K-module, then A is a symmetric Frobenius algebra.

== Relation to formally unramified and formally étale extensions ==
Any separable extension A / K of commutative rings is formally unramified. The converse holds if A is a finitely generated K-algebra. A separable flat (commutative) K-algebra A is formally étale.

== Further results ==
A theorem in the area is that of J. Cuadra that a separable Hopf–Galois extension R | S has finitely generated natural S-module R. A fundamental fact about a separable extension R | S is that it is left or right semisimple extension: a short exact sequence of left or right R-modules that is split as S-modules, is split as R-modules. In terms of G. Hochschild's relative homological algebra, one says that all R-modules are relative (R, S)-projective. Usually relative properties of subrings or ring extensions, such as the notion of separable extension, serve to promote theorems that say that the over-ring shares a property of the subring. For example, a separable extension R of a semisimple algebra S has R semisimple, which follows from the preceding discussion.

There is the celebrated Jans theorem that a finite group algebra A over a field of characteristic p is of finite representation type if and only if its Sylow p-subgroup is cyclic: the clearest proof is to note this fact for p-groups, then note that the group algebra is a separable extension of its Sylow p-subgroup algebra B as the index is coprime to the characteristic. The separability condition above will imply every finitely generated A-module M is isomorphic to a direct summand in its restricted, induced module. But if B has finite representation type, the restricted module is uniquely a direct sum of multiples of finitely many indecomposables, which induce to a finite number of constituent indecomposable modules of which M is a direct sum. Hence A is of finite representation type if B is. The converse is proven by a similar argument noting that every subgroup algebra B is a B-bimodule direct summand of a group algebra A.
