= Pseudo algebraically closed field =

In mathematics, a field $K$ is pseudo algebraically closed if it satisfies certain properties which hold for algebraically closed fields. The concept was introduced by James Ax in 1967.

== Formulation ==
A field K is pseudo algebraically closed (usually abbreviated by PAC) if one of the following equivalent conditions holds:

- Each absolutely irreducible variety $V$ defined over $K$ has a $K$-rational point.
- For each absolutely irreducible polynomial $f\in K[T_1,T_2,\cdots ,T_r,X]$ with $\frac{\partial f}{\partial X}\not =0$ and for each nonzero $g\in K[T_1,T_2,\cdots ,T_r]$ there exists $(\textbf{a},b)\in K^{r+1}$ such that $f(\textbf{a},b)=0$ and $g(\textbf{a})\not =0$.
- Each absolutely irreducible polynomial $f\in K[T,X]$ has infinitely many $K$-rational points.
- If $R$ is a finitely generated integral domain over $K$ with quotient field which is regular over $K$, then there exist a homomorphism $h:R\to K$ such that $h(a) = a$ for each $a \in K$.

== Examples ==
- Algebraically closed fields and separably closed fields are always PAC.
- Pseudo-finite fields and hyper-finite fields are PAC.
- A non-principal ultraproduct of distinct finite fields is (pseudo-finite and hence) PAC. Ax deduces this from the Riemann hypothesis for curves over finite fields.
- Infinite algebraic extensions of finite fields are PAC.
- The PAC Nullstellensatz. The absolute Galois group $G$ of a field $K$ is profinite, hence compact, and hence equipped with a normalized Haar measure. Let $K$ be a countable Hilbertian field and let $e$ be a positive integer. Then for almost all $e$-tuples $(\sigma_1,...,\sigma_e)\in G^e$, the fixed field of the subgroup generated by the automorphisms is PAC. Here the phrase "almost all" means "all but a set of measure zero". (This result is a consequence of Hilbert's irreducibility theorem.)
- Let K be the maximal totally real Galois extension of the rational numbers and i the square root of −1. Then K(i) is PAC.

== Properties ==
- The Brauer group of a PAC field is trivial, as any Severi–Brauer variety has a rational point.
- The absolute Galois group of a PAC field is a projective profinite group; equivalently, it has cohomological dimension at most 1.
- A PAC field of characteristic zero is C1.
