= P-adically closed field =

Type of field in mathematics

In mathematics, a p-adically closed field is a field that enjoys a closure property that is a close analogue for p-adic fields to what real closure is to the real field. They were introduced by James Ax and Simon B. Kochen in 1965.

== Definition ==
Let $K$ be the field $\mathbb{Q}$ of rational numbers and $v$ be its usual $p$-adic valuation (with $v(p)=1$). If $F$ is a (not necessarily algebraic) extension field of $K$, itself equipped with a valuation $w$, we say that $(F,w)$ is formally p-adic when the following conditions are satisfied:

- $w$ extends $v$ (that is, $w(x)=v(x)$ for all $x\in K$),
- the residue field of $w$ coincides with the residue field of $v$ (the residue field being the quotient of the valuation ring $\{x\in F : w(x)\geq 0\}$ by its maximal ideal $\{x\in F : w(x)>0\}$),
- the smallest positive value of $w$ coincides with the smallest positive value of $v$ (namely 1, since $v$ was assumed to be normalized): in other words, a uniformizer for $K$ remains a uniformizer for $F$.

Note that the value group of $K$ may be larger than that of $F$ since it may contain infinitely large elements over the latter.

Thus the formally $p$-adic fields can be viewed as an analogue of the formally real fields.

For example, the field $\Q(i)$ of Gaussian rationals, if equipped with the valuation $w$ given by $w(2+i)=1$ (and $w(2-i)=0$) is formally 5-adic (the place $v=5$ of the rationals splits in two places of the Gaussian rationals since $x^2+1$ factors over the residue field with 5 elements, and $w$ is one of these places). The field of 5-adic numbers (which contains both the rationals and the Gaussian rationals embedded as per the place $w$) is also formally 5-adic. On the other hand, the field of Gaussian rationals is not formally 3-adic for any valuation, because the only valuation $w$ on it which extends the 3-adic valuation is given by $w(3)=1$ and its residue field has 9 elements.

When $F$ is formally $p$-adic but that there does not exist any proper algebraic formally $p$-adic extension of $F$, then $F$ is said to be p-adically closed. For example, the field of $p$-adic numbers is $p$-adically closed, and so is the algebraic closure of the rationals inside it (the field of $p$-adic algebraic numbers).

If $F$ is $p$-adically closed, then

- there is a unique valuation $w$ on $F$ which makes $F$ $p$-adically closed (so it is legitimate to say that $F$, rather than the pair $(F,w)$, is $p$-adically closed),
- $F$ is Henselian with respect to this place (that is, its valuation ring is so),
- the valuation ring of $F$ is exactly the image of the Kochen operator (see below),
- the value group of $F$ is an extension by $\mathbb{Z}$ (the value group of $K$) of a divisible group, with the lexicographical order.

The first statement is an analogue of the fact that the order of a real-closed field is uniquely determined by the algebraic structure.

The definitions given above can be copied to a more general context: if $K$ is a field equipped with a valuation $v$ such that

- the residue field of $K$ is finite (call $q$ its cardinality and $p$ its characteristic),
- the value group of $v$ admits a smallest positive element (call it 1, and say $\pi$ is a uniformizer, i.e. $v(\pi)=1$),
- $K$ has finite absolute ramification, i.e., $v(p)$ is finite (that is, a finite multiple of $v(\pi)=1$),

then we can speak of formally $v$-adic fields (or $\mathfrak{p}$-adic if $\mathfrak{p}$ is the ideal corresponding to $v$) and $v$-adically complete fields. These hypotheses are notably satisfied for the field of rationals, with the prime number $q=\pi=p$ having valuation 1.

== The Kochen operator ==
If $K$ is a field equipped with a valuation $v$ satisfying the hypothesis and with the notations introduced in the previous paragraph, define the Kochen operator by

$$\gamma(z) = \frac{1}{\pi}\,\frac{z^q-z}{(z^q-z)^2-1}$$

(when $z^q-z \neq \pm 1$). It is easy to check that $\gamma(z)$ always has non-negative valuation. The Kochen operator can be thought of as a $p$-adic (or $v$-adic) analogue of the square function in the real case.

An extension field $F$ of $K$ is formally $v$-adic if and only if $1/\pi$ does not belong to the subring generated over the value ring of $K$ by the image of the Kochen operator on $F$. This is an analogue of the statement that a field is formally real when $-1$ is not a sum of squares.

== First-order theory ==
The first-order theory of $p$-adically closed fields (here we are restricting ourselves to the $p$-adic case, i.e., $K$ is the field of rationals and $v$ is the $p$-adic valuation) is complete and model complete, and if we slightly enrich the language it admits quantifier elimination. Thus, one can define $p$-adically closed fields as those whose first-order theory is elementarily equivalent to that of $\mathbb{Q}_p$.
