= Steinitz's theorem (field theory) =

In field theory, Steinitz's theorem states that a finite extension of fields $L/K$ is simple if and only if there are only finitely many intermediate fields between $K$ and $L$.

== Proof ==
Suppose first that $L/K$ is simple, that is to say $L = K(\alpha)$ for some $\alpha \in L$. Let $M$ be any intermediate field between $L$ and $K$, and let $g$ be the minimal polynomial of $\alpha$ over $M$. Let $M'$ be the field extension of $K$ generated by all the coefficients of $g$. Then $M' \subseteq M$ by definition of the minimal polynomial, but the degree of $L$ over $M'$ is (like that of $L$ over $M$) simply the degree of $g$. Therefore, by multiplicativity of degree, $[M:M'] = 1$ and hence $M = M'$.

But if $f$ is the minimal polynomial of $\alpha$ over $K$, then $g | f$, and since there are only finitely many divisors of $f$, the first direction follows.

Conversely, if the number of intermediate fields between $L$ and $K$ is finite, we distinguish two cases:

1. If $K$ is finite, then so is $L$, and any primitive root of $L$ will generate the field extension.
2. If $K$ is infinite, then each intermediate field between $K$ and $L$ is a proper $K$-subspace of $L$, and their union can't be all of $L$. Thus any element outside this union will generate $L$.

== History ==
This theorem was found and proven in 1910 by Ernst Steinitz.
