= Pseudo-finite field =

In mathematics, a pseudo-finite field F is an infinite model of the first-order theory of finite fields. This is equivalent to the condition that F is quasi-finite (perfect with a unique extension of every positive degree) and pseudo algebraically closed (every absolutely irreducible variety over F has a point defined over F).

Every hyperfinite field is pseudo-finite and every pseudo-finite field is quasifinite. Every non-principal ultraproduct of finite fields is pseudo-finite.

Pseudo-finite fields were introduced by James Ax in 1968.
