= Lüroth quartic =

Some examples of Lüroth quartics

In mathematics, a Lüroth quartic is a nonsingular quartic plane curve containing the 10 vertices of a complete pentalateral. They were introduced by Jacob Lüroth (1869). Morley (1919) showed that the Lüroth quartics form an open subset of a degree 54 hypersurface, called the Lüroth hypersurface, in the space P^{14} of all quartics. Böhning & von Bothmer (2011) proved that the moduli space of Lüroth quartics is rational.
