= Primary extension =

In field theory, a branch of algebra, a primary extension L of K is a field extension such that the algebraic closure of K in L is purely inseparable over K.

== Properties ==
- An extension L/K is primary if and only if it is linearly disjoint from the separable closure of K over K.
- A subextension of a primary extension is primary.
- A primary extension of a primary extension is primary (transitivity).
- Any extension of a separably closed field is primary.
- An extension is regular if and only if it is separable and primary.
- A primary extension of a perfect field is regular.
