= Quasi-finite field =

In mathematics, a quasi-finite field is a generalisation of a finite field. Standard local class field theory usually deals with complete valued fields whose residue field is finite (i.e., non-archimedean local fields), but the theory applies equally well when the residue field is only assumed quasi-finite.

== Formal definition ==
A quasi-finite field is a perfect field K together with an isomorphism of topological groups

$$\phi : \hat{\mathbb Z} \to \operatorname{Gal}(K_s/K),$$

where K_{s} is an algebraic closure of K (necessarily separable because K is perfect). The field extension K_{s}/K is infinite, and the Galois group is accordingly given the Krull topology. The group $\widehat{\mathbb{Z}}$ is the profinite completion of integers with respect to its subgroups of finite index.

This definition is equivalent to saying that K has a unique (necessarily cyclic) extension K_{n} of degree n for each integer n ≥ 1, and that the union of these extensions is equal to K_{s}. Moreover, as part of the structure of the quasi-finite field, there is a generator F_{n} for each Gal(K_{n}/K), and the generators must be coherent, in the sense that if n divides m, the restriction of F_{m} to K_{n} is equal to F_{n}.

== Examples ==
The most basic example, which motivates the definition, is the finite field K = F_{q}. It has a unique cyclic extension of degree n, namely K_{n} = F_{q^{n}}. The union of the K_{n} is the algebraic closure K_{s}. We take F_{n} to be the Frobenius element; that is, F_{n}(x) = x^{q}.

Another example is K = C((T)), the ring of formal Laurent series in T over the field C of complex numbers. (These are simply formal power series in which we also allow finitely many terms of negative degree.) Then K has a unique cyclic extension

$$K_n = \mathbf C((T^{1/n}))$$

of degree n for each n ≥ 1, whose union is an algebraic closure of K called the field of Puiseux series, and a generator of Gal(K_{n}/K) is given by

$$F_n(T^{1/n}) = e^{2\pi i/n} T^{1/n}.$$

This construction works if C is replaced by any algebraically closed field C of characteristic zero.

== See also ==
- Pseudo-finite field
