= Normal basis =

Mathematical theorem used in cryptography

In mathematics, specifically the algebraic theory of fields, a normal basis is a special kind of basis for Galois extensions of finite degree, characterised as forming a single orbit for the Galois group. The normal basis theorem states that any finite Galois extension of fields has a normal basis. In algebraic number theory, the study of the more refined question of the existence of a normal integral basis is part of Galois module theory.

== Normal basis theorem ==
Let $F\subseteq K$ be a Galois extension with Galois group $G$. The classical normal basis theorem states that there is an element $\beta\in K$ such that $\{\sigma(\beta) : \sigma\in G\}$ forms a basis of $K$, considered as a vector space over $F$. That is, any element $\alpha \in K$ can be written uniquely as $\alpha = \sum_{\sigma\in G} a_\sigma\, \sigma(\beta)$ for some coefficients $a_\sigma\in F$.

A normal basis contrasts with a primitive element basis of the form $\{1,\beta,\beta^2,\ldots,\beta^{n-1}\}$, where $\beta\in K$ is an element whose minimal polynomial has degree $n=[K:F]$.

== Group representation point of view ==
A field extension K / F with Galois group G can be naturally viewed as a representation of the group G over the field F in which each automorphism is represented by itself; thus K is also a left module for the group algebra F[G]. Every homomorphism of left F[G]-modules $\phi:F[G]\rightarrow K$ is of form $\phi(\sigma) = \sigma(\beta)$ for some $\beta \in K$. Since $\{\sigma : \sigma \in G\}$ is a linear basis of F[G] over F, we see that $\phi$ is bijective iff $\beta$ generates a normal basis of K over F.

The normal basis theorem therefore amounts to the statement saying that if K / F is finite Galois extension, then $K \cong F[G]$ as a left $F[G]$-module: K is isomorphic to the regular representation. Also, a given $\beta$ generates a normal basis iff, when considering K as a G-representation, $\beta$ does not lie in any proper subrepresentation.

== Case of finite fields ==
For finite fields this can be stated as follows: Let $F = \mathrm{GF}(q)=\mathbb{F}_q$ denote the field of q elements, where q = p^{m} is a prime power, and let $K= \mathrm{GF}(q^n)=\mathbb{F}_{q^n}$ denote its extension field of degree n ≥ 1. Here the Galois group is $G = \text{Gal}(K/F) = \{1,\Phi,\Phi^2,\ldots,\Phi^{n-1}\}$ with $\Phi^n = 1,$ a cyclic group generated by the q-power Frobenius automorphism $\Phi(\alpha)=\alpha^q,$with $\Phi^n = 1 =\mathrm{Id}_K.$ Then there exists an element β ∈ K such that
$$\{\beta, \Phi(\beta), \Phi^2(\beta),\ldots,\Phi^{n-1}(\beta)\}
\ = \
\{\beta, \beta^q, \beta^{q^2}, \ldots,\beta^{q^{n-1}}\!\}$$
is a basis of K over F.

=== Proof for finite fields ===
In case the Galois group is cyclic as above, generated by $\Phi$ with $\Phi^n=1,$ the normal basis theorem follows from two basic facts. The first is the linear independence of characters: a multiplicative character is a mapping $\chi$ from a group $H$ to a field $K$ satisfying $\chi(h_1h_2)=\chi(h_1)\chi(h_2)$ and $\chi(1)=1$; then any distinct characters $\chi_1,\chi_2,\ldots$ are linearly independent in the $K$-vector space of mappings $H\to K$. We apply this to the Galois group automorphisms $\chi_i=\Phi^i: K \to K,$ thought of as mappings from the multiplicative group $H=K^\times$. Now $K\cong F^n$as an F-vector space, so we may consider $\Phi : F^n\to F^n$ as an element of $M_n(F)\subset M_n(K)$; since its powers $1,\Phi,\ldots,\Phi^{n-1}$ are linearly independent over $K$ in $M_n(K)$ and a fortiori over $F$ in $M_n(F)$, its minimal polynomial must have degree at least n, i.e. it must be $X^n-1$.

The second basic fact is the classification of modules over a PID such as $F[X]$. Every such module $M$ of finite dimension over F can be represented as $M \cong\bigoplus_{i=1}^k \frac{F[X]}{(f_i(X))}$, where $f_i(X)$ are monic polynomials and $f_{i+1}(X)$ is a multiple of $f_i(X)$, so that the highest $f_k(X)$ is the monic polynomial of smallest degree annihilating the module. For our cyclic Galois group $G$ of order n, we have an $F$-algebra isomorphism $F[G]\cong \frac {F[X]}{(X^n-1)}$ taking the generator $\Phi$ to the variable $X$: this makes every $F[G]$-module into an $F[X]$-module. Consider $M=K$ as an $F[X]$-module under $X\alpha = \Phi(\alpha)$: the minimal monic polynomial $f_k(X)$ annihilating $M$ is the minimal polynomial of $\Phi$, namely $f_k(X)=X^n-1$. Since $\dim_F(M) = n,$ we can only have $k=1$, and $K \cong \frac{F[X]}{(X^n{-}\,1)}$ as $F[X]$-modules (but this is not an isomorphism of rings). Thus we have an isomorphism of $F[G]$-modules

$K \cong \frac{F[X]}{(X^n{-}\,1)}\cong F[G]$,

under which the basis $\{1,X,X^2,\ldots,X^{n-1}\}$ corresponds to the basis $\{1,\Phi,\Phi^2,\ldots,\Phi^{n-1}\}$ of $F[G]$ on the right side, and to a normal basis $\{\beta, \Phi(\beta),\Phi^2(\beta),\ldots,\Phi^{n-1}(\beta)\}$ of $K$ on the left.

Note that this proof would also apply in characteristic zero for a cyclic Kummer extension.

=== Example ===
Consider the field $K=\mathrm{GF}(2^3)=\mathbb{F}_{8}$ over $F=\mathrm{GF}(2)=\mathbb{F}_{2}$, with Frobenius automorphism $\Phi(\alpha)=\alpha^2$. The proof above clarifies the choice of normal bases in terms of the structure of K as a representation of G (or $F[G]$-module). The irreducible factorization
$$X^n-1 \ =\ X^3-1\ = \ (X{-}1)(X^2{+}X{+}1) \ \in\ F[X]$$
means we have a direct sum of F[G]-modules (by the Chinese remainder theorem):
$$K\ \cong\ \frac{F[X]}{(X^3{-}\,1)} \ \cong\ \frac{F[X]}{(X{+}1)} \oplus \frac{F[X]}{(X^2{+}X{+}1)}.$$
The first component is just $F\subset K$, while the second is isomorphic as an $F[G]$-module to $\mathbb{F}_{2^2} \cong \mathbb{F}_2[X]/(X^2{+}X{+}1)$ under the action $\Phi\cdot X^i = X^{i+1}.$ (Thus $K \cong \mathbb F_2\oplus \mathbb F_4$ as $F[G]$-modules, but not as rings.)

The elements $\beta\in K$ which can be used for a normal basis are precisely those outside either of the submodules, so that $(\Phi{+}1)(\beta)\neq 0$ and $(\Phi^2{+}\Phi{+}1)(\beta)\neq 0$. In terms of the $G$-orbits of $K$, which correspond to the irreducible factors in:
$$t^8 - t \ = \ t(t{+}1)\left(t^3 + t + 1\right)\left(t^3 + t^2 + 1\right)\ \in\ F[t],$$
the elements of the submodule $F=\mathbb{F}_2$ are the roots of $t(t{+}1)$; and the nonzero elements of the submodule $\mathbb{F}_4$ are the roots of $t^3+t+1$; while the normal basis, which in this case is unique, is given by the roots of the remaining factor $t^3{+}t^2{+}1$.

By contrast, for the extension field $L = \mathrm{GF}(2^4)=\mathbb{F}_{16}$ in which n = 4 is divisible by p = 2, we have the $F[G]$-module isomorphism
$$L \ \cong\ \mathbb{F}_2[X]/(X^4{-}1)\ =\ \mathbb{F}_2[X]/(X{+}1)^4.$$
Here the operator $\Phi\cong X$ is not diagonalizable, the module $L$ has nested submodules given by generalized eigenspaces of $\Phi$, and the normal basis elements β are those outside the largest proper generalized eigenspace, the elements with $(\Phi{+}1)^3(\beta)\neq 0$.

=== Application to cryptography ===
The normal basis is frequently used in cryptographic applications based on the discrete logarithm problem, such as elliptic curve cryptography, since arithmetic using a normal basis is typically more computationally efficient than using other bases.

For example, in the field $K=\mathrm{GF}(2^3)=\mathbb{F}_{8}$ above, we may represent elements as bit-strings:
$$\alpha \ =\ (a_2,a_1,a_0)\ =\ a_2\Phi^2(\beta) + a_1\Phi(\beta)+a_0\beta\ =\ a_2\beta^4 + a_1\beta^2 +a_0\beta,$$
where the coefficients are bits $a_i\in \mathrm{GF}(2)=\{0,1\}.$ Now we can square elements by doing a left circular shift, $\alpha^2=\Phi(a_2,a_1,a_0) = (a_1,a_0,a_2)$, since squaring β^{4} gives β^{8} = β. This makes the normal basis especially attractive for cryptosystems that utilize frequent squaring.

=== Primitive normal basis ===
A primitive normal basis of an extension of finite fields $K/F$ is a normal basis that is generated by a primitive element of $K$, that is a generator of the multiplicative group $K^\times$. (Note that this is a stronger definition of primitive element than mentioned above: one requires powers of the element to produce every non-zero element of $K$, not merely a basis.) Lenstra and Schoof (1987) proved that every extension of finite fields possesses a primitive normal basis, the case when $F$ is a prime field having been settled by Harold Davenport.

== Proof for the case of infinite fields ==
Suppose $K/F$ is a finite Galois extension of the infinite field F. Let $n=[K:F]$, $G = \text{Gal}(K/F) = \{\sigma_1...\sigma_n\}$ with $\sigma_1 = \text{Id}$. By the primitive element theorem there exists $\alpha \in K$ such that $K=F[\alpha]$ and $\sigma_i(\alpha)\ne\sigma_j(\alpha)$ for $i\ne j$; and write $\alpha_i = \sigma_i(\alpha)$. The minimal polynomial f of $\alpha$ over K is:
$$f(X) = \prod_{i=1}^n(X - \alpha_i),$$
a degree n monic polynomial which is irreducible in $K[X]$. Since f is separable (having simple roots) we may define the Lagrange interpolation polynomials $g_1(X), \ldots, g_n(X)$ satisfying $g_i(\alpha_i) = 1$ and $g_i(\alpha_j) = 0$ for $i\neq j$:
$$\begin {align}
g(X) &=\ \frac{f(X)}{(X-\alpha)f'(\alpha)} \ =\
\prod_{\begin {array}{c}1 \le j \le n \\ j\ne i\end {array}}
\frac{X-\alpha_j}{\alpha - \alpha_j},
\\
g_i(X) &=\ \sigma_i(g(X))\ = \ \frac{f(X)}{(X-\alpha_i) f'(\alpha_i)}\ =\
\prod_{\begin {array}{c}1 \le j \le n \\ j\ne i\end {array}}\frac{X-\alpha_j}{\alpha_i - \alpha_j} .
\end {align}$$
Next, define an $n \times n$ matrix of polynomials $A = (A_{ij}(X))$ by
$$A_{ij}(X) = \sigma_i(\sigma_j(g(X)) = \sigma_i(g_j(X)),$$
and let $D(X) = \det A(X)$. To see this a non-zero polynomial, observe that $A_{ij}(X) = g_k(X)$, where k is determined by $\sigma_k = \sigma_i \cdot \sigma_j$, and $k=1$ iff $\sigma_i = \sigma_j^{-1}$; thus $A(\alpha)$ is the permutation matrix corresponding to the permutation of G which sends each $\sigma_i$ to $\sigma_i^{-1}$, and $D(\alpha) = \det A(\alpha) = \pm 1$. Since $D(X)$ is a non-zero polynomial, it has only a finite number of roots; and since we assumed F is infinite, we can find $a\in F$ with $D(a)\ne 0$. Define
$$\beta =  g(a), \qquad
\beta_i = g_i(a) = \sigma_i(\beta).$$
We claim that $\{\beta_1, \ldots, \beta_n\}$ is a normal basis; i.e. that $\beta_1, \ldots,\beta_n$ are linearly independent over F. Suppose $\sum_{j=1}^n c_j \beta_j = 0$ for some $\vec c=(c_1,...,c_n)\in F^n$; applying any $\sigma_i$ gives $\sum_{j=1}^n c_j \sigma_i(g_j(a)) = 0$, so that $A(a) \cdot \vec{c} = \vec{0}$. Since $\det A(a) = D(a) \ne 0$, we conclude that $\vec{c} = \vec{0}$, which completes the proof.

It is tempting to take $a=\alpha$ because $D(\alpha)\neq0$, but we need $a \in F$ to conclude that $\sigma_i(g_j(a)) = \sigma_i(g_j(X))|_{X=\sigma_i(a)}=\sigma_i(g_j(X))|_{X=a}$ is a matrix entry of $A(a)=A(X)|_{x=a}$.

== Free elements ==
If K / F is a Galois extension and x in K generates a normal basis over F, then x is free in K / F. If x has the property that for every subgroup H of the Galois group G, with fixed field K^{H}, x is free for K / K^{H}, then x is said to be completely free in K / F. Every Galois extension has a completely free element.

== See also ==
- Dual basis in a field extension
- Polynomial basis
- Zech's logarithm
