= Jacob Lüroth =

German mathematician (1844–1910)

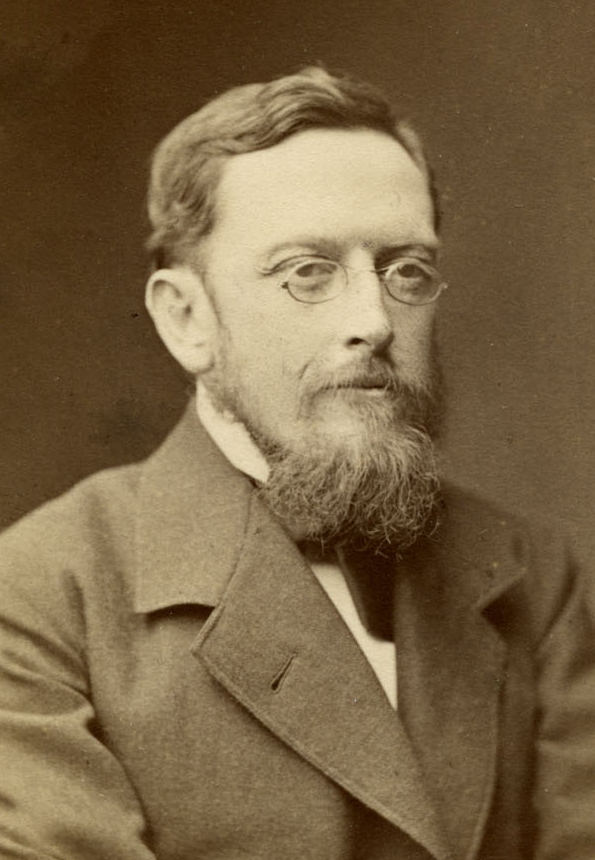
Jacob Lüroth

Jacob Lüroth (18 February 1844, Mannheim, Germany – 14 September 1910, Munich, Germany) was a German mathematician who proved Lüroth's theorem and introduced Lüroth quartics. His name is sometimes written Lueroth, following the common printing convention for umlauted characters. He began his studies in astronomy at the University of Bonn, but switched to mathematics when his poor eyesight made taking astronomical observations impossible. He received his doctorate in 1865 from Heidelberg University, for a thesis on Pascal's theorem.

From 1868 he was at the Karlsruhe Institute of Technology, where he became a professor in 1869, and from 1880 he was a professor at the Technical University of Munich, succeeding Felix Klein. In 1883, he became a professor at the University of Freiburg, where he remained until his retirement.

Following up on Carl Friedrich Gauss's work on statistics, Lüroth discovered the t-distribution usually credited to William Sealy Gosset. In modern terms, the calculation that led Lüroth to the t-distribution was the computation of a Bayesian interval.

In honor of his mathematical achievements, Lüroth was elected to the Royal Bavarian Academy of Sciences in 1882, to the Academy of Sciences Leopoldina the following year, and in 1909 to the Heidelberg Academy of Sciences.

== See also ==
- Distributive lattice
- Netto's theorem
- Lüroth quartic
- Lüroth's theorem
