= Brauer's theorem on forms =

On the representability of 0 by forms over certain fields in sufficiently many variables

There also is Brauer's theorem on induced characters.

In mathematics, Brauer's theorem, named for Richard Brauer, is a result on the representability of 0 by forms over certain fields in sufficiently many variables.

== Statement of Brauer's theorem ==
Let K be a field such that for every integer r > 0 there exists an integer ψ(r) such that for n ≥ ψ(r) every equation

$$(*)\qquad a_1x_1^r+\cdots+a_nx_n^r=0,\quad a_i\in K,\quad i=1,\ldots,n$$

has a non-trivial (i.e. not all x_{i} are equal to 0) solution in K. Then, given homogeneous polynomials f_{1},...,f_{k} of degrees r_{1},...,r_{k} respectively with coefficients in K, for every set of positive integers r_{1},...,r_{k} and every non-negative integer l, there exists a number ω(r_{1},...,r_{k},l) such that for n ≥ ω(r_{1},...,r_{k},l) there exists an l-dimensional affine subspace M of K^{n} (regarded as a vector space over K) satisfying

$$f_1(x_1,\ldots,x_n)=\cdots=f_k(x_1,\ldots,x_n)=0,\quad\forall(x_1,\ldots,x_n)\in M.$$

== An application to the field of p-adic numbers ==
Letting K be the field of p-adic numbers in the theorem, the equation (*) is satisfied, since $\mathbb{Q}_p^*/\left(\mathbb{Q}_p^*\right)^b$, b a natural number, is finite. Choosing k = 1, one obtains the following corollary:

A homogeneous equation f(x_{1},...,x_{n}) = 0 of degree r in the field of p-adic numbers has a non-trivial solution if n is sufficiently large.

One can show that if n is sufficiently large according to the above corollary, then n is greater than r^{2}. Indeed, Emil Artin conjectured that every homogeneous polynomial of degree r over Q_{p} in more than r^{2} variables represents 0. This is obviously true for r = 1, and it is well known that the conjecture is true for r = 2 (see, for example, J.-P. Serre, A Course in Arithmetic, Chapter IV, Theorem 6). See quasi-algebraic closure for further context.

In 1950 Demyanov verified the conjecture for r = 3 and p ≠ 3, and in 1952 D. J. Lewis independently proved the case r = 3 for all primes p. But in 1966 Guy Terjanian constructed a homogeneous polynomial of degree 4 over Q_{2} in 18 variables that has no non-trivial zero. On the other hand, the Ax–Kochen theorem shows that for any fixed degree Artin's conjecture is true for all but finitely many Q_{p}.

== Notes ==
- Davenport, Harold (2005). Analytic methods for Diophantine equations and Diophantine inequalities. Cambridge Mathematical Library. Edited and prepared by T. D. Browning. With a preface by R. C. Vaughan, D. R. Heath-Brown and D. E. Freeman (2nd ed.). Cambridge University Press. ISBN 0-521-60583-0. Zbl 1125.11018.
