= Supernatural number =

Generalized natural number

Hasse diagram of the lattice of supernatural numbers; primes other than 2 and 3 are omitted for simplicity.

In mathematics, the supernatural numbers, sometimes called generalized natural numbers or Steinitz numbers, are a generalization of the natural numbers. They were used by Ernst Steinitz in 1910 as a part of his work on field theory.

A supernatural number $\omega$ is a formal product:

$$\omega = \prod_p p^{n_p},$$

where $p$ runs over all prime numbers, and each $n_p$ is either zero, a natural number or infinity. This can be thought of as the prime factorization of the supernatural number. In the special case where only finitely many values $n_p$ are nonzero and no index $n_p$ is $\infty$, we get the positive natural numbers; for example, $60 = 2^2 \cdot 3 \cdot 5$ can be represented as
$$2^2 3^1 5^1 7^0 11^0 13^0\dots$$
There are also many supernatural numbers with no natural counterpart, such as
$$2^1 3^1 5^1 7^1 11^1 13^1\dots$$
and
$$2^1 3^\infty 5^0 7^0 11^0 13^0\dots$$

Sometimes the notation $v_p(\omega)$ is used instead of $n_p$. $v_p(\omega)$ can be seen as the p-adic valuation of $\omega$, and it agrees with the standard p-adic valuation on the natural numbers.

There is no natural way to add supernatural numbers, but they can be multiplied, with $\prod_p p^{n_p}\cdot\prod_p p^{m_p}=\prod_p p^{n_p+m_p}$. Similarly, the notion of divisibility extends to the supernaturals with $\omega_1\mid\omega_2$ if $v_p(\omega_1)\leq v_p(\omega_2)$ for all $p$. The notion of the least common multiple and greatest common divisor can also be generalized for supernatural numbers, by defining

$$\displaystyle \operatorname{lcm}(\{\omega_i\}) \displaystyle =\prod_p p^{\sup(v_p(\omega_i))}$$

and

$$\displaystyle \operatorname{gcd}(\{\omega_i\}) \displaystyle =\prod_p p^{\inf(v_p(\omega_i))}$$.

With these definitions, the gcd or lcm of infinitely many natural numbers (or supernatural numbers) is a supernatural number.

Supernatural numbers are used to define orders and indices of profinite groups and subgroups, in which case many of the theorems from finite group theory carry over exactly. They are used to encode the algebraic extensions of a finite field.

Supernatural numbers also arise in the classification of uniformly hyperfinite algebras.

== See also ==
- Profinite integer
