= Hyper-finite field =

In mathematics, a hyper-finite field is an uncountable field similar in many ways to finite fields. More precisely a field F is called hyper-finite if it is uncountable and quasi-finite, and for every subfield E, every absolutely entire E-algebra (regular field extension of E) of smaller cardinality than F can be embedded in F. They were introduced by Ax (1968). Every hyper-finite field is a pseudo-finite field, and is in particular a model for the first-order theory of finite fields.
