= Biquaternion algebra =

In mathematics, a biquaternion algebra is a compound of quaternion algebras over a field.

The biquaternions of William Rowan Hamilton (1844) and the related split-biquaternions and dual quaternions do not form biquaternion algebras in this sense.

== Definition ==
Let F be a field of characteristic not equal to 2. A biquaternion algebra over F is a tensor product of two quaternion algebras.

A biquaternion algebra is a central simple algebra of dimension 16 and degree 4 over the base field: it has exponent (order of its Brauer class in the Brauer group of F) equal to 1 or 2.

== Albert's theorem ==
Let A = (a_{1},a_{2}) and B = (b_{1},b_{2}) be quaternion algebras over F.

The Albert form for A, B is

$$q = \left\langle{ -a_1, -a_2, a_1a_2, b_1, b_2, -b_1b_2 }\right\rangle \ .$$

It can be regarded as the difference in the Witt ring of the ternary forms attached to the imaginary subspaces of A and B. The quaternion algebras are linked if and only if the Albert form is isotropic, otherwise unlinked.

Albert's theorem states that the following are equivalent:

- A ⊗ B is a division algebra;
- The Albert form is anisotropic;
- A, B are division algebras and they do not have a common quadratic splitting field.

In the case of linked algebras we can further classify the other possible structures for the tensor product in terms of the Albert form. If the form is hyperbolic, then the biquaternion algebra is isomorphic to the algebra M_{4}(F) of 4×4 matrices over F: otherwise, it is isomorphic to the product M_{2}(F) ⊗ D where D is a quaternion division algebra over F. The Schur index of a biquaternion algebra is 4, 2 or 1 according as the Witt index of the Albert form is 0, 1 or 3.

== Characterisation ==
A theorem of Albert states that every central simple algebra of degree 4 and exponent 2 is a biquaternion algebra.
