= Ax–Kochen theorem =

On the existence of zeros of homogeneous polynomials over the p-adic numbers

The Ax–Kochen theorem, named for James Ax and Simon B. Kochen, states that for each positive integer d there is a finite set Y_{d} of prime numbers, such that if p is any prime not in Y_{d} then every homogeneous polynomial of degree d over the p-adic numbers in at least d^{2} + 1 variables has a nontrivial zero.

== The proof of the theorem ==
The proof of the theorem makes extensive use of methods from mathematical logic, such as model theory.

One first proves Serge Lang's theorem, stating that the analogous theorem is true for the field F_{p}((t)) of formal Laurent series over a finite field F_{p} with $Y_d = \varnothing$. In other words, every homogeneous polynomial of degree d with more than d^{2} variables has a non-trivial zero (so F_{p}((t)) is a C_{2} field).

Then one shows that if two Henselian valued fields have equivalent valuation groups and residue fields, and the residue fields have characteristic 0, then they are elementarily equivalent (which means that a first-order sentence is true for one if and only if it is true for the other).

Next one applies this to two fields, one given by an ultraproduct over all primes of the fields F_{p}((t)) and the other given by an ultraproduct over all primes of the p-adic fields Q_{p}. Both residue fields are given by an ultraproduct over the fields F_{p}, so are isomorphic and have characteristic 0, and both value groups are the same, so the ultraproducts are elementarily equivalent. (Taking ultraproducts is used to force the residue field to have characteristic 0; the residue fields of F_{p}((t)) and Q_{p} both have non-zero characteristic p.)

The elementary equivalence of these ultraproducts implies that for any sentence in the language of valued fields, there is a finite set Y of exceptional primes, such that for any p not in this set the sentence is true for F_{p}((t)) if and only if it is true for the field of p-adic numbers. Applying this to the sentence stating that every non-constant homogeneous polynomial of degree d in at least d^{2}+1 variables represents 0, and using Lang's theorem, one gets the Ax–Kochen theorem.

== Alternative proof ==
Jan Denef found a purely geometric proof for a conjecture of Jean-Louis Colliot-Thélène which generalizes the Ax–Kochen theorem.

== Exceptional primes ==
Emil Artin conjectured this theorem with the finite exceptional set Y_{d} being empty (that is, that all p-adic fields are C_{2}), but Guy Terjanian found the following 2-adic counterexample for d = 4. Define

$$G(x) = G(x_1,x_2,x_3) = \sum x_i^4 - \sum_{i\,<\,j} x_i^2 x_j^2 - x_1 x_2 x_3 (x_1 + x_2+x_3).$$

Then G has the property that it is 1 mod 4 if some x is odd, and 0 mod 16 otherwise. It follows easily from this that the homogeneous form

G(x) + G(y) + G(z) + 4G(u) + 4G(v) + 4G(w)

of degree d = 4 in 18 > d^{2} variables has no non-trivial zeros over the 2-adic integers.

Later Terjanian showed that for each prime p and multiple d > 2 of p(p − 1), there is a form over the p-adic numbers of degree d with more than d^{2} variables but no nontrivial zeros. In other words, for all d > 2, Y_{d} contains all primes p such that p(p − 1) divides d.

Brown (1978) gave an explicit but very large bound for the exceptional set of primes p. If the degree d is 1, 2, or 3 the exceptional set is empty. Heath-Brown (2010) showed that if d = 5 the exceptional set is bounded by 13, and Wooley (2008) showed that for d = 7 the exceptional set is bounded by 883 and for d = 11 it is bounded by 8053.

== See also ==
- Brauer's theorem on forms
- Quasi-algebraic closure
