= Uniformly hyperfinite algebra =

In mathematics, particularly in the theory of C*-algebras, a uniformly hyperfinite, or UHF, algebra is a C*-algebra that can be written as the closure, in the norm topology, of an increasing union of finite-dimensional full matrix algebras.

== Definition ==
A UHF C*-algebra is the direct limit of an inductive system {A_{n}, φ_{n}} where each A_{n} is a finite-dimensional full matrix algebra and each φ_{n} : A_{n} → A_{n+1} is a unital embedding. Suppressing the connecting maps, one can write

$$A = \overline {\cup_n A_n}.$$

== Classification ==
If

$$A_n \simeq M_{k_n} (\mathbb C),$$

then rk_{n} = k_{n + 1} for some integer r and

$$\phi_n (a) = a \otimes I_r,$$

where I_{r} is the identity in the r × r matrices. The sequence ...k_{n}|k_{n + 1}|k_{n + 2}... determines a formal product

$$\delta(A) = \prod_p p^{t_p}$$

where each p is prime and t_{p} = sup {m | p^{m} divides k_{n} for some n}, possibly zero or infinite. The formal product δ(A) is said to be the supernatural number corresponding to A. Glimm showed that the supernatural number is a complete invariant of UHF C*-algebras. In particular, there are uncountably many isomorphism classes of UHF C*-algebras.

If δ(A) is finite, then A is the full matrix algebra M_{δ(A)}. A UHF algebra is said to be of infinite type if each t_{p} in δ(A) is 0 or ∞.

In the language of K-theory, each supernatural number

$$\delta(A) = \prod_p p^{t_p}$$

specifies an additive subgroup of Q that is the rational numbers of the type n/m where m formally divides δ(A). This group is the K_{0} group of A.

== CAR algebra ==
One example of a UHF C*-algebra is the CAR algebra. It is defined as follows: let H be a separable complex Hilbert space H with orthonormal basis f_{n} and L(H) the bounded operators on H, consider a linear map

$$\alpha : H \rightarrow L(H)$$

with the property that

$$\{ \alpha(f_n), \alpha(f_m) \} = 0 \quad  \mbox{and} \quad \alpha(f_n)^*\alpha(f_m) + \alpha(f_m)\alpha(f_n)^* =
\langle f_m, f_n \rangle I.$$

The CAR algebra is the C*-algebra generated by

$$\{ \alpha(f_n) \}\;.$$

The embedding

$$C^*(\alpha(f_1), \cdots, \alpha(f_n)) \hookrightarrow  C^*(\alpha(f_1), \cdots, \alpha(f_{n+1}))$$

can be identified with the multiplicity 2 embedding

$$M_{2^n} \hookrightarrow M_{2^{n+1}}.$$

Therefore, the CAR algebra has supernatural number 2^{∞}. This identification also yields that its K_{0} group is the dyadic rationals.
