= Chevalley–Warning theorem =

Certain polynomial equations in enough variables over a finite field have solutions

In number theory, the Chevalley–Warning theorem implies that certain polynomial equations in sufficiently many variables over a finite field have solutions. It was proved by Ewald Warning (1935) and a slightly weaker form of the theorem, known as Chevalley's theorem, was proved by Chevalley (1935). Chevalley's theorem implied Artin's and Dickson's conjecture that finite fields are quasi-algebraically closed fields (Artin 1982, page x).

== Statement of the theorems ==
Let $\mathbb{F}$ be a finite field and $\{f_j\}_{j=1}^r\subseteq\mathbb{F}[X_1,\ldots,X_n]$ be a set of polynomials such that the number of variables satisfies

$$n>\sum_{j=1}^r d_j$$

where $d_j$ is the total degree of $f_j$. The theorems are statements about the solutions of the following system of polynomial equations

$$f_j(x_1,\dots,x_n)=0\quad\text{for}\, j=1,\ldots, r.$$

- The Chevalley–Warning theorem states that the number of common solutions $(a_1,\dots,a_n) \in \mathbb{F}^n$ is divisible by the characteristic $p$ of $\mathbb{F}$. Or in other words, the cardinality of the vanishing set of $\{f_j\}_{j=1}^r$ is $0$ modulo $p$.
- The Chevalley theorem states that if the system has the trivial solution $(0,\dots,0) \in \mathbb{F}^n$, that is, if the polynomials have no constant terms, then the system also has a non-trivial solution $(a_1,\dots,a_n) \in \mathbb{F}^n \backslash \{(0,\dots,0)\}$.

Chevalley's theorem is an immediate consequence of the Chevalley–Warning theorem since $p$ is at least 2.

Both theorems are best possible in the sense that, given any $n$, the list $f_j = x_j, j=1,\dots,n$ has total degree $n$ and only the trivial solution. Alternatively, using just one polynomial, we can take f_{1} to be the degree n polynomial given by the norm of x_{1}a_{1} + ... + x_{n}a_{n} where the elements a form a basis of the finite field of order p^{n}.

Warning proved another theorem, known as Warning's second theorem, which states that if the system of polynomial equations has the trivial solution, then it has at least $q^{n-d}$ solutions where $q$ is the size of the finite field and $d := d_1 + \dots + d_r$. Chevalley's theorem also follows directly from this.

== Proof of Warning's theorem ==
Remark: If $i<q-1$ then

$$\sum_{x\in\mathbb{F}}x^i=0$$

so the sum over $\mathbb{F}^n$ of any polynomial in $x_1,\ldots,x_n$ of degree less than $n(q-1)$ also vanishes.

The total number of common solutions modulo $p$ of $f_1, \ldots, f_r = 0$ is equal to

$$\sum_{x\in\mathbb{F}^n}(1-f_1^{q-1}(x))\cdot\ldots\cdot(1-f_r^{q-1}(x))$$

because each term is 1 for a solution and 0 otherwise. If the sum of the degrees of the polynomials $f_i$ is less than n then this vanishes by the remark above.

== Artin's conjecture ==
It is a consequence of Chevalley's theorem that finite fields are quasi-algebraically closed. This had been conjectured by Emil Artin in 1935. The motivation behind Artin's conjecture was his observation that quasi-algebraically closed fields have trivial Brauer group, together with the fact that finite fields have trivial Brauer group by Wedderburn's theorem.

== The Ax–Katz theorem ==
The Ax–Katz theorem, named after James Ax and Nicholas Katz, determines more accurately a power $q^b$ of the cardinality $q$ of $\mathbb{F}$ dividing the number of solutions; here, if $d$ is the largest of the $d_j$, then the exponent $b$ can be taken as the ceiling function of

$$\frac{n - \sum_j d_j}{d}.$$

The Ax–Katz result has an interpretation in étale cohomology as a divisibility result for the (reciprocals of) the zeroes and poles of the local zeta-function. Namely, the same power of $q$ divides each of these algebraic integers.

== See also ==
- Combinatorial Nullstellensatz
