= Separable polynomial =

Polynomial coprime with its derivative

In mathematics, a polynomial P(X) over a given field K is separable if its roots are distinct in an algebraic closure of K, that is, the number of distinct roots is equal to the degree of the polynomial.

This concept is closely related to square-free polynomial. If K is a perfect field then the two concepts coincide. In general, P(X) is separable if and only if it is square-free over any field that contains K, which holds if and only if P(X) is coprime to its formal derivative D P(X).

== Older definition ==
In an older definition, P(X) was considered separable if each of its irreducible factors in K[X] is separable in the modern definition. In this definition, separability depended on the field K; for example, any polynomial over a perfect field would have been considered separable. This definition, although it can be convenient for Galois theory, is no longer in use.

== Separable field extensions ==
Separable polynomials are used to define separable extensions: A field extension K ⊂ L is a separable extension if and only if for every α in L which is algebraic over K, the minimal polynomial of α over K is a separable polynomial.

Inseparable extensions (that is, extensions which are not separable) may occur only in positive characteristic.

The criterion above leads to the quick conclusion that if P is irreducible and not separable, then D P(X) = 0. Thus we must have

P(X) = Q(X^{p})

for some polynomial Q over K, where the prime number p is the characteristic.

With this clue we can construct an example:

P(X) = X^{p} − T

with K the field of rational functions in the indeterminate T over the finite field with p elements. Here one can prove directly that P(X) is irreducible and not separable. This is actually a typical example of why inseparability matters; in geometric terms P represents the mapping on the projective line over the finite field, taking co-ordinates to their pth power. Such mappings are fundamental to the algebraic geometry of finite fields. Put another way, there are coverings in that setting that cannot be 'seen' by Galois theory. (See Radical morphism for a higher-level discussion.)

If L is the field extension

K(T^{1/p}),

in other words the splitting field of P, then L/K is an example of a purely inseparable field extension. It is of degree p, but has no automorphism fixing K, other than the identity, because T^{1/p} is the unique root of P. This shows directly that Galois theory must here break down. A field such that there are no such extensions is called perfect. That finite fields are perfect follows a posteriori from their known structure.

One can show that the tensor product of fields of L with itself over K for this example has nilpotent elements that are non-zero. This is another manifestation of inseparability: that is, the tensor product operation on fields need not produce a ring that is a product of fields (so, not a commutative semisimple ring).

If P(x) is separable, and its roots form a group (a subgroup of the field K), then P(x) is an additive polynomial.

== Applications in Galois theory ==
Separable polynomials occur frequently in Galois theory.

For example, let P be an irreducible polynomial with integer coefficients and p be a prime number which does not divide the leading coefficient of P. Let Q be the polynomial over the finite field with p elements, which is obtained by reducing modulo p the coefficients of P. Then, if Q is separable (which is the case for every p but a finite number) then the degrees of the irreducible factors of Q are the lengths of the cycles of some permutation of the Galois group of P.

Another example: P being as above, a resolvent R for a group G is a polynomial whose coefficients are polynomials in the coefficients of P, which provides some information on the Galois group of P. More precisely, if R is separable and has a rational root then the Galois group of P is contained in G. For example, if D is the discriminant of P then $X^2-D$ is a resolvent for the alternating group. This resolvent is always separable (assuming the characteristic is not 2) if P is irreducible, but most resolvents are not always separable.

== See also ==
- Frobenius endomorphism
