= Tensor product of fields =

Ring produced from two fields

In mathematics, the tensor product of two fields is their tensor product as algebras over a common subfield. If no subfield is explicitly specified, the two fields must have the same characteristic and the common subfield is their prime subfield.

The tensor product of two fields is sometimes a field, and often a direct product of fields; in some cases, it can contain non-zero nilpotent elements.

The tensor product of two fields expresses in a single structure the different way to embed the two fields in a common extension field.

== Compositum of fields ==
First, one defines the notion of the compositum of fields. This construction occurs frequently in field theory. The idea behind the compositum is to make the smallest field containing two other fields. In order to formally define the compositum, one must first specify a tower of fields. Let k be a field and L and K be two extensions of k. The compositum, denoted K.L, is defined to be $K.L = k(K \cup L)$ where the right-hand side denotes the extension generated by K and L. This assumes some field containing both K and L. Either one starts in a situation where an ambient field is easy to identify (for example if K and L are both subfields of the complex numbers), or one proves a result that allows one to place both K and L (as isomorphic copies) in some large enough field.

In many cases one can identify K.L as a vector space tensor product, taken over the field N that is the intersection of K and L. For example, if one adjoins √2 to the rational field $\mathbb{Q}$ to get K, and √3 to get L, it is true that the field M obtained as K.L inside the complex numbers $\mathbb{C}$ is (up to isomorphism)

$$K\otimes_{\mathbb Q}L$$

as a vector space over $\mathbb{Q}$. (This type of result can be verified, in general, by using the ramification theory of algebraic number theory.)

Subfields K and L of M are linearly disjoint (over a subfield N) when in this way the natural N-linear map of

$$K\otimes_NL$$

to K.L is injective. Naturally enough this isn't always the case, for example when K = L. When the degrees are finite, injectivity is equivalent here to bijectivity. Hence, when K and L are linearly disjoint finite-degree extension fields over N, $K.L \cong K \otimes_N L$, as with the aforementioned extensions of the rationals.

A significant case in the theory of cyclotomic fields is that for the nth roots of unity, for n a composite number, the subfields generated by the p^{k}th roots of unity for prime powers dividing n are linearly disjoint for distinct p.

== The tensor product as ring ==
To get a general theory, one needs to consider a ring structure on $K \otimes_N L$. One can define the product $(a\otimes b)(c\otimes d)$ to be $ac \otimes bd$ (see Tensor product of algebras). This formula is multilinear over N in each variable; and so defines a ring structure on the tensor product, making $K \otimes_N L$ into a commutative N-algebra, called the tensor product of fields.

== Analysis of the ring structure ==
The structure of the ring can be analysed by considering all ways of embedding both K and L in some field extension of N. The construction here assumes the common subfield N; but does not assume a priori that K and L are subfields of some field M (thus getting round the caveats about constructing a compositum field). Whenever one embeds K and L in such a field M, say using embeddings α of K and β of L, there results a ring homomorphism γ from $K \otimes_N L$ into M defined by:

$$\gamma(a\otimes b) = (\alpha(a)\otimes1)\star(1\otimes\beta(b)) = \alpha(a).\beta(b).$$

The kernel of γ will be a prime ideal of the tensor product; and conversely any prime ideal of the tensor product will give a homomorphism of N-algebras to an integral domain (inside a field of fractions) and so provides embeddings of K and L in some field as extensions of (a copy of) N.

In this way one can analyse the structure of $K \otimes_N L$: there may in principle be a non-zero nilradical (intersection of all prime ideals) – and after taking the quotient by that one can speak of the product of all embeddings of K and L in various M, over N.

In case K and L are finite extensions of N, the situation is particularly simple since the tensor product is of finite dimension as an N-algebra (and thus an Artinian ring). One can then say that if R is the radical, one has $(K \otimes_N L) / R$ as a direct product of finitely many fields. Each such field is a representative of an equivalence class of (essentially distinct) field embeddings for K and L in some extension M.

== Examples ==
To give an explicit example consider the fields $K=\mathbb{Q}[x]/(x^2-2)$ and $L=\mathbb{Q}[y]/(y^2-2)$. Clearly $\mathbb{Q}(\sqrt{2})\cong K\cong L\neq K$ are isomorphic but technically unequal fields with their (set theoretic) intersection being the prime field $N=\mathbb{Q}$. Their tensor product

$$K\otimes L=K\otimes_{N} L=\mathbb{Q}[x]/(x^2-2)\otimes_{\mathbb{Q}}\mathbb{Q}[y]/(y^2-2) \cong \mathbb{Q}(\sqrt{2})[z]/(z^2-2)\cong \mathbb{Q}(\sqrt{2})\otimes_{\mathbb{Q}}\mathbb{Q}(\sqrt{2})$$

is not a field, but a 4-dimensional $\mathbb{Q}$-algebra. Furthermore this algebra is isomorphic to a direct sum of fields

$$K\otimes L\cong \mathbb{Q}(\sqrt{2})[z]/(z^2-2)\cong \mathbb{Q}(\sqrt{2})\oplus\mathbb{Q}(\sqrt{2})$$

via the map induced by $1\mapsto (1,1), z\mapsto (\sqrt{2},-\sqrt{2})$. Morally $\tilde{N}=\mathbb{Q}(\sqrt{2})$ should be considered the largest common subfield up to isomorphism of K and L via the isomorphisms $\tilde{N}=\mathbb{Q}(\sqrt{2})\cong K\cong L$. When one performs the tensor product over this better candidate for the largest common subfield we actually get a (rather trivial) field

$$K\otimes_{\tilde{N}} L=\mathbb{Q}[x]/(x^2-2)\otimes_{\mathbb{Q}(\sqrt{2})}\mathbb{Q}[y]/(y^2-2) \cong \mathbb{Q}(\sqrt{2})=\tilde{N}\cong K\cong L$$.

For another example, if K is generated over $\mathbb{Q}$ by the cube root of 2, then $K \otimes_{\mathbb Q} K$ is the sum of (a copy of) K, and a splitting field of

X^{3} − 2,

of degree 6 over $\mathbb{Q}$. One can prove this by calculating the dimension of the tensor product over $\mathbb{Q}$ as 9, and observing that the splitting field does contain two (indeed three) copies of K, and is the compositum of two of them. That incidentally shows that R = {0} in this case.

An example leading to a non-zero nilpotent: let

P(X) = X^{p} − T

with K the field of rational functions in the indeterminate T over the finite field with p elements (see Separable polynomial: the point here is that P is not separable). If L is the field extension K(T^{1/p}) (the splitting field of P) then L/K is an example of a purely inseparable field extension. In $L \otimes_K L$ the element

$$T^{1/p}\otimes1-1\otimes T^{1/p}$$

is nilpotent: by taking its pth power one gets 0 by using K-linearity.

== Classical theory of real and complex embeddings ==
In algebraic number theory, tensor products of fields are (implicitly, often) a basic tool. If K is an extension of $\mathbb{Q}$ of finite degree n, $K\otimes_{\mathbb Q}\mathbb R$ is always a product of fields isomorphic to $\mathbb{R}$ or $\mathbb{C}$. The totally real number fields are those for which only real fields occur: in general there are r_{1} real and r_{2} complex fields, with r_{1} + 2r_{2} = n as one sees by counting dimensions. The field factors are in 1–1 correspondence with the real embeddings, and pairs of complex conjugate embeddings, described in the classical literature.

This idea applies also to $K\otimes_{\mathbb Q}\mathbb Q_p,$ where $\mathbb{Q}$_{p} is the field of p-adic numbers. This is a product of finite extensions of $\mathbb{Q}$_{p}, in 1–1 correspondence with the completions of K for extensions of the p-adic metric on $\mathbb{Q}$.

== Consequences for Galois theory ==
This gives a general picture, and indeed a way of developing Galois theory (along lines exploited in Grothendieck's Galois theory). It can be shown that for separable extensions the radical is always {0}; therefore the Galois theory case is the semisimple one, of products of fields alone.

== See also ==
- Extension of scalars—tensor product of a field extension and a vector space over that field
