= Linked field =

In mathematics, a linked field is a field for which the quadratic forms attached to quaternion algebras have a common property.

== Linked quaternion algebras ==
Let F be a field of characteristic not equal to 2. Let A = (a_{1},a_{2}) and B = (b_{1},b_{2}) be quaternion algebras over F. The algebras A and B are linked quaternion algebras over F if there is x in F such that A is equivalent to (x,y) and B is equivalent to (x,z).

The Albert form for A, B is

$$q = \left\langle{ -a_1, -a_2, a_1a_2, b_1, b_2, -b_1b_2 }\right\rangle \ .$$

It can be regarded as the difference in the Witt ring of the ternary forms attached to the imaginary subspaces of A and B. The quaternion algebras are linked if and only if the Albert form is isotropic.

== Linked fields ==
The field F is linked if any two quaternion algebras over F are linked. Every global and local field is linked since all quadratic forms of degree 6 over such fields are isotropic.

The following properties of F are equivalent:

- F is linked.
- Any two quaternion algebras over F are linked.
- Every Albert form (dimension six form of discriminant −1) is isotropic.
- The quaternion algebras form a subgroup of the Brauer group of F.
- Every dimension five form over F is a Pfister neighbour.
- No biquaternion algebra over F is a division algebra.

A nonreal linked field has u-invariant equal to 1,2,4 or 8.
