= Transcendental extension =

Field extension that is not algebraic

In mathematics, a transcendental extension $L/K$ is a field extension such that there exists an element in the field $L$ that is transcendental over the field $K$; that is, an element that is not a root of any univariate polynomial with coefficients in $K$. In other words, a transcendental extension is a field extension that is not algebraic. For example, $\mathbb{C}$ and $\mathbb{R}$ are both transcendental extensions of $\mathbb{Q}.$

A transcendence basis of a field extension $L/K$ (or a transcendence basis of $L$ over $K$) is a maximal algebraically independent subset of $L$ over $K.$ Transcendence bases share many properties with bases of vector spaces. In particular, all transcendence bases of a field extension have the same cardinality, called the transcendence degree of the extension. Thus, a field extension is a transcendental extension if and only if its transcendence degree is nonzero.

Transcendental extensions are widely used in algebraic geometry. For example, the dimension of an algebraic variety is the transcendence degree of its function field. Also, global function fields are transcendental extensions of degree one of a finite field, and play in number theory in positive characteristic a role that is very similar to the role of algebraic number fields in characteristic zero.

== Transcendence basis ==
Zorn's lemma shows there exists a maximal linearly independent subset of a vector space (i.e., a basis). A similar argument with Zorn's lemma shows that, given a field extension L / K, there exists a maximal algebraically independent subset of L over K. It is then called a transcendence basis. By maximality, an algebraically independent subset S of L over K is a transcendence basis if and only if L is an algebraic extension of K(S), the field obtained by adjoining the elements of S to K.

The exchange lemma (a version for algebraically independent sets) implies that if S and S' are transcendence bases, then S and S' have the same cardinality. Then the common cardinality of transcendence bases is called the transcendence degree of L over K and is denoted as $\operatorname{tr.deg.}_K L$ or $\operatorname{tr.deg.}(L/K)$. There is thus an analogy: a transcendence basis and transcendence degree, on the one hand, and a basis and dimension on the other hand. This analogy can be made more formal, by observing that linear independence in vector spaces and algebraic independence in field extensions both form examples of finitary matroids (pregeometries). Any finitary matroid has a basis, and all bases have the same cardinality.

If G is a generating set of L (i.e., L = K(G)), then a transcendence basis for L can be taken as a subset of G. Thus, $\operatorname{tr.deg.}_K L \le$ the minimum cardinality of generating sets of L over K. In particular, a finitely generated field extension admits a finite transcendence basis.

If no field K is specified, the transcendence degree of a field L is its degree relative to some fixed base field; for example, the prime field of the same characteristic, or K, if L is an algebraic function field over K.

The field extension L / K is purely transcendental if there is a subset S of L that is algebraically independent over K and such that L = K(S).

A separating transcendence basis of L / K is a transcendence basis S such that L is a separable algebraic extension over K(S). A field extension L / K is said to be separably generated if it admits a separating transcendence basis. If a field extension is finitely generated and it is also separably generated, then each generating set of the field extension contains a separating transcendence basis. Over a perfect field, every finitely generated field extension is separably generated; i.e., it admits a finite separating transcendence basis.

== Examples ==
- An extension is algebraic if and only if its transcendence degree is 0; the empty set serves as a transcendence basis here.
- The field of rational functions in n variables K(x_{1},...,x_{n}) (i.e. the field of fractions of the polynomial ring K[x_{1},...,x_{n}]) is a purely transcendental extension with transcendence degree n over K; we can for example take {x_{1},...,x_{n}} as a transcendence base.
- More generally, the transcendence degree of the function field L of an n-dimensional algebraic variety over a ground field K is n.
- Q(√2, e) has transcendence degree 1 over Q because √2 is algebraic while e is transcendental.
- The transcendence degree of C or R over Q is the cardinality of the continuum. (Since Q is countable, the field Q(S) will have the same cardinality as S for any infinite set S, and any algebraic extension of Q(S) will have the same cardinality again.)
- The transcendence degree of Q(e, π) over Q is either 1 or 2; the precise answer is unknown because it is not known whether e and π are algebraically independent (see Schanuel's conjecture).
- If S is a compact Riemann surface, the field C(S) of meromorphic functions on S has transcendence degree 1 over C.

== Facts ==
If M / L and L / K are field extensions, then

trdeg(M / K) = trdeg(M / L) + trdeg(L / K)

This is proven by showing that a transcendence basis of M / K can be obtained by taking the union of a transcendence basis of M / L and one of L / K.

If the set S is algebraically independent over K, then the field K(S) is isomorphic to the field of rational functions over K in a set of variables of the same cardinality as S. Each such rational function is a fraction of two polynomials in finitely many of those variables, with coefficients in K.

Two algebraically closed fields are isomorphic if and only if they have the same characteristic and the same transcendence degree over their prime field.

== The transcendence degree of an integral domain ==
Let $A \subseteq B$ be integral domains. If $Q(A)$ and $Q(B)$ denote the fields of fractions of A and B, then the transcendence degree of B over A is defined as the transcendence degree of the field extension $Q(B)/Q(A).$

The Noether normalization lemma implies that if R is an integral domain that is a finitely generated algebra over a field k, then the Krull dimension of R is the transcendence degree of R over k.

This has the following geometric interpretation: if X is an affine algebraic variety over a field k, the Krull dimension of its coordinate ring equals the transcendence degree of its function field, and this defines the dimension of X. It follows that, if X is not an affine variety, its dimension (defined as the transcendence degree of its function field) can also be defined locally as the Krull dimension of the coordinate ring of the restriction of the variety to an open affine subset.

== Relations to differentials ==
Let $K/k$ be a finitely generated field extension. Then

$$\dim_K \Omega_{K/k} \ge \operatorname{trdeg}(K/ k).$$

where $\Omega_{K/k}$ denotes the module of Kähler differentials. Also, in the above, the equality holds if and only if K is separably generated over k (meaning it admits a separating transcendence basis).

== Applications ==
Transcendence bases are useful for extending field homomorphisms, because they separate a field extension into a purely transcendental part and an algebraic part. The algebraic part is handled by the following standard extension theorem: if E / F is algebraic and $\Omega$ is algebraically closed, then every field homomorphism F → $\Omega$ extends to a field homomorphism E → $\Omega$. In particular, every isomorphism of fields extends to an isomorphism of their algebraic closures. For example, let L be an algebraically closed field, K a subfield of L, and f a field automorphism of K. Choose a transcendence basis S of L / K. Since S is algebraically independent over K, applying f to the coefficients of rational functions and fixing every element of S defines an automorphism of K(S). By the defining property of a transcendence basis, L is algebraic over K(S); since L is also algebraically closed, it is an algebraic closure of K(S). The extension theorem therefore extends the automorphism of K(S) to an automorphism of L, whose restriction to K is f.

As another application, we show that there are (many) proper subfields of the complex number field C which are (as fields) isomorphic to C. For the proof, take a transcendence basis S of C / Q. S is an infinite (even uncountable) set, so there exist (many) maps f: S → S which are injective but not surjective. Any such map can be extended to a field homomorphism Q(S) → Q(S) which is not surjective. Such a field homomorphism can in turn be extended to the algebraic closure C, and the resulting field homomorphisms C → C are not surjective.

The transcendence degree can give an intuitive understanding of the size of a field. For instance, a theorem due to Siegel states that if X is a compact, connected, complex manifold of dimension n and K(X) denotes the field of (globally defined) meromorphic functions on it, then trdeg_{C}(K(X)) ≤ n.

== See also ==
- Lüroth's theorem, a theorem about purely transcendental extensions of degree one
- Regular extension
