= Primitive element theorem =

Field theory theorem

In field theory, the primitive element theorem states that every finite separable field extension is simple, i.e. generated by a single element. This theorem implies in particular that all algebraic number fields over the rational numbers, and all extensions in which both fields are finite, are simple.

== Terminology ==
Let $E/F$ be a field extension. An element $\alpha\in E$ is a primitive element for $E/F$ if $E=F(\alpha),$ i.e. if every element of $E$ can be written as a rational function in $\alpha$ with coefficients in $F$. If there exists such a primitive element, then $E/F$ is referred to as a simple extension.

If the field extension $E/F$ has primitive element $\alpha$ and is of finite degree $n = [E:F]$, then every element $\gamma\in E$ can be written in the form

$$\gamma =a_0+a_1{\alpha}+\cdots+a_{n-1}{\alpha}^{n-1},$$

for unique coefficients $a_0,a_1,\ldots,a_{n-1}\in F$. That is, the set

$$\{1,\alpha,\ldots,{\alpha}^{n-1}\}$$

is a basis for E as a vector space over F. The degree n is equal to the degree of the irreducible polynomial of α over F, the unique monic $f(X)\in F[X]$ of minimal degree with α as a root (a linear dependency of $\{1,\alpha,\ldots,\alpha^{n-1},\alpha^n\}$).

If L is a splitting field of $f(X)$ containing its n distinct roots $\alpha_1,\ldots,\alpha_n$, then there are n field embeddings $\sigma_i : F(\alpha)\hookrightarrow L$ defined by $\sigma_i(\alpha)=\alpha_i$ and $\sigma(a)=a$ for $a\in F$, and these extend to automorphisms of L in the Galois group, $\sigma_1,\ldots,\sigma_n\in \mathrm{Gal}(L/F)$. Indeed, for an extension field with $[E: F]=n$, an element $\alpha$ is a primitive element if and only if $\alpha$ has n distinct conjugates $\sigma_1(\alpha),\ldots,\sigma_n(\alpha)$ in some splitting field $L \supseteq E$.

== Example ==
If one adjoins to the rational numbers $F = \mathbb{Q}$ the two irrational numbers $\sqrt{2}$ and $\sqrt{3}$ to get the extension field $E=\mathbb{Q}(\sqrt{2},\sqrt{3})$ of degree 4, one can show this extension is simple, meaning $E=\mathbb{Q}(\alpha)$ for a single $\alpha\in E$. Taking $\alpha = \sqrt{2} + \sqrt{3}$, the powers 1, α, α^{2}, α^{3} can be expanded as linear combinations of 1, $\sqrt{2}$, $\sqrt{3}$, $\sqrt{6}$ with integer coefficients. One can solve this system of linear equations for $\sqrt{2}$ and $\sqrt{3}$ over $\mathbb{Q}(\alpha)$, to obtain $\sqrt{2} = \tfrac12(\alpha^3-9\alpha)$ and $\sqrt{3} = -\tfrac12(\alpha^3-11\alpha)$. This shows that α is indeed a primitive element:

$$\mathbb{Q}(\sqrt 2, \sqrt 3)=\mathbb{Q}(\sqrt2 + \sqrt3).$$

One may also use the following more general argument. The field $E=\Q(\sqrt 2,\sqrt 3)$ clearly has four field automorphisms $\sigma_1,\sigma_2,\sigma_3,\sigma_4: E\to E$ defined by $\sigma_i(\sqrt 2)=\pm\sqrt 2$ and $\sigma_i(\sqrt 3)=\pm\sqrt 3$ for each choice of signs. The minimal polynomial $f(X)\in\Q[X]$ of $\alpha=\sqrt 2+\sqrt 3$ must have $f(\sigma_i(\alpha)) = \sigma_i(f(\alpha)) = 0$, so $f(X)$ must have at least four distinct roots $\sigma_i(\alpha)=\pm\sqrt 2 \pm\sqrt 3$. Thus $f(X)$ has degree at least four, and $[\Q(\alpha):\Q]\geq 4$, but this is the degree of the entire field, $[E:\Q]=4$, so $E = \Q(\alpha )$.

== Theorem statement ==
The primitive element theorem states:

Every separable field extension of finite degree is simple.

This theorem applies to algebraic number fields, i.e. finite extensions of the rational numbers Q, since Q has characteristic 0 and therefore every finite extension over Q is separable.

Using the fundamental theorem of Galois theory, the former theorem immediately follows from Steinitz's theorem.

== Characteristic p ==
For a non-separable extension $E/F$ of characteristic p, there is nevertheless a primitive element provided the degree [E : F] is p: indeed, there can be no non-trivial intermediate subfields since their degrees would be factors of the prime p.

When [E : F] = p^{2}, there may not be a primitive element (in which case there are infinitely many intermediate fields by Steinitz's theorem). The simplest example is $E=\mathbb{F}_p(T,U)$, the field of rational functions in two indeterminates T and U over the finite field with p elements, and $F=\mathbb{F}_p(T^p,U^p)$. In fact, for any $\alpha=g(T,U)$ in $E \setminus F$, the Frobenius endomorphism shows that the element $\alpha^p$ lies in F , so α is a root of $f(X)=X^p-\alpha^p\in F[X]$, and α cannot be a primitive element (of degree p^{2} over F), but instead F(α) is a non-trivial intermediate field.

== Proof ==
Suppose first that $F$ is infinite. By induction, it suffices to prove that any finite extension $E=F(\beta,\gamma)$ is simple. For $c\in F$, suppose $\alpha = \beta+ c\gamma$ fails to be a primitive element, $F(\alpha)\subsetneq F(\beta,\gamma)$. Then $\gamma\notin F(\alpha)$, since otherwise $\beta = \alpha-c\gamma\in F(\alpha)=F(\beta,\gamma)$. Consider the minimal polynomials of $\beta,\gamma$ over $F(\alpha)$, respectively $f(X), g(X) \in F(\alpha)[X]$, and take a splitting field $L$ containing all roots $\beta,\beta',\ldots$ of $f(X)$ and $\gamma,\gamma',\ldots$ of $g(X)$. Since $\gamma\notin F(\alpha)$, there is another root $\gamma'\neq \gamma$, and a field automorphism $\sigma:L\to L$ which fixes $F(\alpha)$ and takes $\sigma(\gamma)=\gamma'$. We then have $\sigma(\alpha) =\alpha$, and:

$\beta + c \gamma = \sigma(\beta + c \gamma) = \sigma(\beta) + c \, \sigma(\gamma)$, and therefore $c = \frac{\sigma(\beta) - \beta}{\gamma - \sigma(\gamma)}$.

Since there are only finitely many possibilities for $\sigma(\beta)=\beta'$ and $\sigma(\gamma)=\gamma'$, only finitely many $c\in F$ fail to give a primitive element $\alpha=\beta+c\gamma$. All other values give $F(\alpha)=F(\beta,\gamma)$.

For the case where $F$ is finite, we simply take $\alpha$ to be a primitive root of the finite extension field $E$.

== History ==
In his First Memoir of 1831, published in 1846, Évariste Galois sketched a proof of the classical primitive element theorem in the case of a splitting field of a polynomial over the rational numbers. The gaps in his sketch could easily be filled (as remarked by the referee Poisson) by exploiting a theorem of Lagrange from 1771, which Galois certainly knew. It is likely that Lagrange had already been aware of the primitive element theorem for splitting fields. Galois then used this theorem heavily in his development of the Galois group. Since then it has been used in the development of Galois theory and the fundamental theorem of Galois theory.

The primitive element theorem was proved in its modern form by Ernst Steinitz, in an influential article on field theory in 1910, which also contains Steinitz's theorem; Steinitz called the "classical" result Theorem of the primitive elements and his modern version Theorem of the intermediate fields.

Emil Artin reformulated Galois theory in the 1930s without relying on primitive elements.
