= Regular extension =

Type of field extension

In field theory, a branch of algebra, a field extension $L/k$ is said to be regular if k is algebraically closed in L (i.e., $k = \hat k$ where $\hat k$ is the set of elements in L algebraic over k) and L is separable over k, or equivalently, $L \otimes_k \overline{k}$ is an integral domain when $\overline{k}$ is the algebraic closure of $k$ (that is, to say, $L, \overline{k}$ are linearly disjoint over k).

== Properties ==
- Regularity is transitive: if F/E and E/K are regular then so is F/K.
- If F/K is regular then so is E/K for any E between F and K.
- The extension L/k is regular if and only if every subfield of L finitely generated over k is regular over k.
- Any extension of an algebraically closed field is regular.
- An extension is regular if and only if it is separable and primary.
- A purely transcendental extension of a field is regular.

== Self-regular extension ==
There is also a similar notion: a field extension $L / k$ is said to be self-regular if $L \otimes_k L$ is an integral domain. A self-regular extension is relatively algebraically closed in k. However, a self-regular extension is not necessarily regular.
