= Guy Terjanian =

French mathematician

Guy Terjanian is a French mathematician who has worked on algebraic number theory. He achieved his Ph.D. under Claude Chevalley in 1970, and at that time published a counterexample to the original form of a conjecture of Emil Artin, which suitably modified had just been proved as the Ax-Kochen theorem.

In 1977, he proved that if p is an odd prime number, and the natural numbers x, y and z satisfy $x^{2p} + y^{2p} = z^{2p}$, then 2p must divide x or y.

== See also ==
- Ax–Kochen theorem
