= Perfect field =

Algebraic structure

In algebra, a field $K$ is perfect if any one of the following equivalent conditions holds:

- Every irreducible polynomial over $K$ has no multiple roots in any field extension $L/K$.
- Every irreducible polynomial over $K$ has non-zero formal derivative.
- Every irreducible polynomial over $K$ is separable.
- Every finite extension of $K$ is separable.
- Every algebraic extension of $K$ is separable.
- Either $K$ has characteristic 0, or, when $K$ has characteristic $p>0$, every element of $K$ is a $p$-th power.
- Either $K$ has characteristic 0, or, when $K$ has characteristic $p>0$, the Frobenius endomorphism $x\mapsto x^p$ is an automorphism.
- The separable closure of $K$ is algebraically closed.
- Every reduced commutative $K$-algebra $A$ is a separable algebra; i.e., $A \otimes_k L$ is reduced for every field extension $L/K$.

Otherwise, $K$ is called imperfect.

In particular, all fields of characteristic zero and all finite fields are perfect.

Perfect fields are significant because Galois theory over these fields becomes simpler, since the general Galois assumption of field extensions being separable is automatically satisfied over these fields (see third condition above).

Another important property of perfect fields is that they admit Witt vectors.

More generally, a ring of characteristic $p$ ($p$ a prime) is called perfect if the Frobenius endomorphism is an automorphism. When restricted to integral domains, this is equivalent to the above condition "every element of $K$ is a $p$-th power".

== Examples ==
Examples of perfect fields are:

- every field of characteristic zero, so $\mathbb{Q}$ and its finite extensions, as well as $\mathbb{R}$ and $\mathbb{C}$;
- every finite field $\mathbb{F}_q$;
- every algebraically closed field;
- the union of a set of perfect fields totally ordered by extension;
- fields algebraic over a perfect field.

Most fields that are encountered in practice are perfect. The imperfect case arises mainly in algebraic geometry in characteristic $p>0$. Every imperfect field is necessarily transcendental over its prime subfield (the minimal subfield), because the latter is perfect.

An example of an imperfect field is the field $\mathbb{F}_p(t)$ of rational polynomials in the unknown $t$. This can be seen from the fact that the Frobenius endomorphism sends $x \mapsto x^p$ and therefore is not surjective. Equivalently, one can show that the polynomial $f(x)=x^p-t$, which is an element of $(\mathbb{F}_p(t))[x]$, is irreducible but inseparable.

Imperfect fields cause technical difficulties because irreducible polynomials can become reducible in the algebraic closure of the base field. For example, consider $f(x,y) = x^p + ay^p \in k[x,y]$ for $k$ an imperfect field of characteristic $p$ and $a$ not a $p$-th power in $k$. Then in its algebraic closure $k^{\operatorname{alg}}[x,y]$, the following equality holds:

$$f(x,y) = (x + b y)^p ,$$

where $b^p=a$ and such a $b$ exists in this algebraic closure. Geometrically, this means that $f$ does not define an affine plane curve in $k[x,y]$.

== Field extension over a perfect field ==
Any finitely generated field extension $K$ over a perfect field $k$ is separably generated, i.e. admits a separating transcendence base, that is, a transcendence base $\Gamma$ such that $K$ is separably algebraic over $k(\Gamma)$.

== Perfect closure and perfection ==
Every field can be embedded in a perfect field: in characteristic $p$, a field $k$ adjoined with all $p^r$-th roots ($r\geq 1$) is perfect; it is called the perfect closure of $k$ and usually denoted by $k^{p^{-\infty}}$. For example, $\mathbb{F}_q(t)$ embeds into $\mathbb{F}_q(t,t^{1/p},t^{1/p^2},\ldots)$.

The perfect closure can be used in a test for separability. More precisely, a commutative $k$-algebra $A$ is separable if and only if $A \otimes_k k^{p^{-\infty}}$ is reduced.

The perfect closure can be defined by a universal property: the perfect closure of a ring $A$ of characteristic $p$ is a perfect ring $A_p$ of characteristic $p$ together with a ring homomorphism $u:A\to A_p$ such that for any other perfect ring $B$ of characteristic $p$ with a homomorphism $v:A\to B$, there is a unique homomorphism $f:A_p\to B$ such that $v$ factors through $u$ (i.e. $v=fu$). The perfect closure always exists; the proof involves "adjoining $p$-th roots of elements of $A$", similar to the case of fields.

The perfection of a ring $A$ of characteristic $p$ is the dual notion (though this term is sometimes used for the perfect closure). In other words, the perfection $R(A)$ of $A$ is a perfect ring of characteristic $p$ together with a map $\theta:R(A)\to A$ such that for any perfect ring $B$ of characteristic $p$ equipped with a map $\phi:B\to A$, there is a unique map $f:B\to R(A)$ such that $\phi$ factors through $\theta$ (i.e. $\phi=\theta f$). The perfection of $A$ may be constructed as follows. Consider the projective system

$$\cdots\rightarrow A\rightarrow A\rightarrow A\rightarrow\cdots$$

where the transition maps are the Frobenius endomorphism. The inverse limit of this system is $R(A)$ and consists of sequences $(x_0,x_1,\dots)$ of elements of $A$ such that $x_{i+1}^p=x_i$ for all $i$. The map $\theta:R(A)\to A$ sends $(x_i)$ to $x_0$.

== See also ==
- Perfect ring
- Quasi-finite field
