= Linear disjointness =

In mathematics, algebras A, B over a field k inside some field extension $\Omega$ of k are said to be linearly disjoint over k if the following equivalent conditions are met:

- (i) The map $A \otimes_k B \to AB$ induced by $(x, y) \mapsto xy$ is injective.
- (ii) Any k-basis of A remains linearly independent over B.
- (iii) There exists a k-basis of A which remains linearly independent over B.
- (iv) If $u_i, v_j$ are k-bases for A, B, then the products $u_i v_j$ are linearly independent over k.

Note that, since every subalgebra of $\Omega$ is a domain, (i) implies $A \otimes_k B$ is a domain (in particular reduced). Conversely if A and B are fields and either A or B is an algebraic extension of k and $A \otimes_k B$ is a domain then it is a field and A and B are linearly disjoint. However, there are examples where $A \otimes_k B$ is a domain but A and B are not linearly disjoint: for example, A = B = k(t), the field of rational functions over k.

One also has: A, B are linearly disjoint over k if and only if the subfields of $\Omega$ generated by $A, B$, resp. are linearly disjoint over k. (cf. Tensor product of fields)

Suppose A, B are linearly disjoint over k. If $A' \subset A$, $B' \subset B$ are subalgebras, then $A'$ and $B'$ are linearly disjoint over k. Conversely, if any finitely generated subalgebras of algebras A, B are linearly disjoint, then A, B are linearly disjoint (since the condition involves only finite sets of elements.)

== See also ==
- Tensor product of fields
