= Simple extension =

Field extension generated by a one element

In field theory, a simple extension is a field extension that is generated by the adjunction of a single element, called a primitive element. Simple extensions are well understood and can be completely classified.

The primitive element theorem states that every finite separable extension is a simple extension. For a field of characteristic 0 such as the rationals, this means all finite extensions are simple.

== Definition ==
A field extension L/K is called a simple extension if there exists an element θ in L with

$$L = K(\theta).$$

This means that every element of L can be expressed as a rational fraction in θ, with coefficients in K; that is, it is produced from θ and elements of K by the field operations +, −, •, / . Equivalently, L is the smallest field that contains both K and θ.

There are two different kinds of simple extensions (see § Structure of simple extensions below):

1. The element θ may be transcendental over K, which means that it is not a root of any polynomial with coefficients in K. In this case $K(\theta)$ is isomorphic to the field of rational functions $K(X).$
2. Otherwise, θ is algebraic over K; that is, θ is a root of a polynomial over K. The monic polynomial $p(X)$ of minimal degree n, with θ as a root, is called the minimal polynomial of θ. Its degree equals the degree of the field extension, that is, the dimension of L viewed as a K-vector space. In this case, every element of $K(\theta)$ can be uniquely expressed as a polynomial in θ of degree less than n, and $K(\theta)$ is isomorphic to the quotient ring $K[X]/(p(X)).$

In both cases, the element θ is called a generating element or primitive element for the extension; one says also L is generated over K by θ.

For example, every finite field is a simple extension of the prime field of the same characteristic. More precisely, if p is a prime number and $q=p^n,$ the field $L=\mathbb{F}_{q}$ of q elements is a simple extension of degree n of $K=\mathbb{F}_{p}.$ In fact, L is generated as a field by any element θ that is a root of an irreducible polynomial of degree n in $K[X]$.

However, in the case of finite fields, the term primitive element is usually reserved for a stronger notion, an element γ that generates $L^\times = L-\{0\}$ as a multiplicative group, so that every nonzero element of L is a power of γ, i.e. is produced from γ using only the group operation • . To distinguish these meanings, one uses the term "generator" or field primitive element for the weaker meaning, reserving "primitive element" or group primitive element for the stronger meaning. (See Finite field § Multiplicative structure and Primitive element (finite field)).

== Structure of simple extensions ==
Let L be a simple extension of K generated by θ. For the polynomial ring K[X], one of its main properties is the unique ring homomorphism

$$\begin{align}
\varphi: K[X] &\rightarrow L\\
f(X) &\mapsto f(\theta)\,.
\end{align}$$

Two cases may occur:

1. If $\varphi$ is injective, it may be extended injectively to the field of fractions K(X) of K[X]. Since L is generated by θ, this implies that $\varphi$ is an isomorphism from K(X) onto L. This implies that every element of L is equal to an irreducible fraction of polynomials in θ, and that two such irreducible fractions are equal if and only if one may pass from one to the other by multiplying the numerator and the denominator by the same non zero element of K.
2. If $\varphi$ is not injective, let p(X) be a generator of its kernel, which is thus the minimal polynomial of θ. The image of $\varphi$ is a subring of L, and thus an integral domain. This implies that p is an irreducible polynomial, and thus that the quotient ring $K[X]/\langle p(X) \rangle$ is a field. As L is generated by θ, $\varphi$ is surjective, and $\varphi$ induces an isomorphism from $K[X]/\langle p(X) \rangle$ onto L. This implies that every element of L is equal to a unique polynomial in θ of degree lower than the degree $n = \operatorname{deg}p(X)$. That is, we have a K-basis of L given by $1,\theta,\theta^2,\ldots,\theta^{n-1}$.

== Examples ==
- C / R generated by $\theta = i =\sqrt{-1}$.
- Q($\sqrt{2}$) / Q generated by $\theta=\sqrt{2}$.
- Any number field (i.e., a finite extension of Q) is a simple extension Q(θ) for some θ. For example, $\mathbf{Q}(\sqrt{3}, \sqrt{7})$ is generated by $\theta=\sqrt{3} + \sqrt{7}$.
- F(X) / F, a field of rational functions, is generated by the formal variable X.

== See also ==
- Companion matrix for the multiplication map on a simple field extension

== Literature ==
- Roman, Steven (1995). Field Theory. Graduate Texts in Mathematics. Vol. 158. New York: Springer-Verlag. ISBN 0-387-94408-7. Zbl 0816.12001.
