= Field extension =

Construction of a larger algebraic field by "adding elements" to a smaller field

In mathematics, particularly in algebra, a field extension is a pair of fields $K \subseteq L$, such that the operations of K are those of L restricted to K. In this case, L is an extension field of K, and K is a subfield of L. For example, under the usual notions of addition and multiplication, the complex numbers are an extension field of the real numbers; the real numbers are a subfield of the complex numbers.

Field extensions are fundamental in algebraic number theory, and in the study of polynomial roots through Galois theory, and are widely used in algebraic geometry.

== Subfield ==
A subfield $K$ of a field $L$ is a subset $K\subseteq L$ that is a field with respect to the field operations inherited from $L$. Equivalently, a subfield is a subset that contains the multiplicative identity $1$, and is closed under the operations of addition, subtraction, multiplication, and taking the inverse of a nonzero element of $K$.

As 1 – 1 = 0, the latter definition implies $K$ and $L$ have the same zero element.

For example, the field of rational numbers is a subfield of the real numbers, which is itself a subfield of the complex numbers. More generally, the field of rational numbers is (or is isomorphic to) a subfield of any field of characteristic $0$.

The characteristic of a subfield is the same as the characteristic of the larger field.

== Extension field ==
If $K$ is a subfield of $L$, then $L$ is an extension field or simply extension of $K$, and this pair of fields is a field extension. Such a field extension is denoted $L/K$ (read as "$L$ over $K$").

If $L$ is an extension of $F$, which is in turn an extension of $K$, then $F$ is said to be an intermediate field (or intermediate extension or subextension) of $L/K$.

Given a field extension $L/K$, the larger field $L$ is a $K$-vector space. The dimension of this vector space is called the degree of the extension and is denoted by $[L:K]$.

The degree of an extension is 1 if and only if the two fields are equal. In this case, the extension is a trivial extension. Extensions of degree 2 and 3 are called quadratic extensions and cubic extensions, respectively. A finite extension is an extension that has a finite degree.

Given two extensions $L/K$ and $M/L$, the extension $M/K$ is finite if and only if both $L/K$ and $M/L$ are finite. In this case, one has

$$[M : K]=[M : L]\cdot[L : K].$$

Given a field extension $L/K$ and a subset $S$ of $L$, there is a smallest subfield of $L$ that contains $K$ and $S$. It is the intersection of all subfields of $L$ that contain $K$ and $S$, and is denoted by $K(S)$ (read as "$K$ adjoin $S$"). One says that $K(S)$ is the field generated by $S$ over $K$, and that $S$ is a generating set of $K(S)$ over $K$. When $S=\{x_1, \ldots, x_n\}$ is finite, one writes $K(x_1, \ldots, x_n)$ instead of $K(\{x_1, \ldots, x_n\}),$ and one says that $K(S)$ is finitely generated over $K$. If $S$ consists of a single element $s$, the extension $K(s)/K$ is called a simple extension and $s$ is called a primitive element of the extension.

An extension field of the form $K(S)$ is often said to result from the adjunction of $S$ to $K$.

In characteristic 0, every finite extension is a simple extension. This is the primitive element theorem, which does not hold true for fields of non-zero characteristic.

If a simple extension $K(s)/K$ is not finite, the field $K(s)$ is isomorphic to the field of rational fractions in $s$ over $K$.

== Caveat ==
The notation L / K is purely formal and does not imply the formation of a quotient ring or quotient group or any other kind of division. Instead the slash expresses the word "over". Some authors use the notations L : K or L | K, while others may simply indicate verbally that $L\supset K$ is a field extension. Towers of extensions are often depicted diagrammatically. For example, the diagram below depicts the situation where L is an extension of K and K is an extension of F:

$$\begin{array}{c} L \\ \Big| \\ K \\ \Big| \\ F \end{array}$$

It is often useful to talk about field extensions in situations where the smaller field is not actually contained in the larger one, but is "naturally embedded", where a natural embedding is an injective ring homomorphism of the smaller field into the larger one that is either unique or uniquely defined by the context. Considering such a natural embedding as a field extension is an abuse of terminology that makes often the wording much simpler.

For example, there is a unique field homomorphism from $\Q$, the field of rational numbers, into any field of characteristic 0, and one says commonly that every field of characteristic zero is an extension of $\Q$. On the other hand, there are two injective homomorphisms of the field $K=\Q[X]/(X^2-X-1)$ into $\R$, which map $X$ either to the golden ratio $\omega = \tfrac {1+\sqrt 5}2$ or to $-1/\omega$. Although the two homomorphisms have the same image, it would be confusing to say that $\R$ is an extension of $K$.

Henceforth, we will consider field homomorphisms—always injective—as inclusions, when no confusion can arise.

== Examples ==
The field of complex numbers $\Complex$ is an extension field of the field of real numbers $\R$, and $\R$ in turn is an extension field of the field of rational numbers $\Q$. Clearly then, $\Complex/\Q$ is also a field extension. We have $[\Complex:\R] =2$ because $\{1, i\}$ is a basis, so the extension $\Complex/\R$ is finite. This is a simple extension because $\Complex = \R(i).$ $[\R:\Q] =\mathfrak c$ (the cardinality of the continuum), so this extension is infinite.

The field

$$\Q(\sqrt{2}) =  \left \{ a + b\sqrt{2} \mid a,b \in \Q \right \},$$

is an extension field of $\Q,$ also clearly a simple extension. The degree is 2 because $\left\{1, \sqrt{2}\right\}$ can serve as a basis.

The field

$$\begin{align}
\Q\left(\sqrt{2}, \sqrt{3}\right) &= \Q \left(\sqrt{2}\right) \left(\sqrt{3}\right) \\
&= \left\{ a+b\sqrt{3} \mid a,b \in \Q\left(\sqrt{2}\right) \right\} \\
&= \left\{ a + b \sqrt{2} + c\sqrt{3} + d\sqrt{6} \mid a,b,c, d \in \Q \right\},
\end{align}$$

is an extension field of both $\Q(\sqrt{2})$ and $\Q,$ of degree 2 and 4 respectively. It is also a simple extension, as one can show that

$$\begin{align}
\Q(\sqrt{2}, \sqrt{3}) &= \Q (\sqrt{2} + \sqrt{3}) \\
&= \left \{ a + b (\sqrt{2} + \sqrt{3}) + c (\sqrt{2} + \sqrt{3})^2 + d(\sqrt{2} + \sqrt{3})^3 \mid a,b,c, d \in \Q\right\}.
\end{align}$$

Finite extensions of $\Q$ are also called algebraic number fields and are important in number theory. Another extension field of the rationals, which is also important in number theory, although not a finite extension, is the field of p-adic numbers $\Q_p$ for a prime number p.

It is common to construct an extension field of a given field K as a quotient ring of the polynomial ring K[X] in order to "create" a root for a given polynomial f(X). Suppose for instance that K does not contain any element x with x^{2} = −1. Then the polynomial $X^2+1$ is irreducible in K[X], consequently the ideal generated by this polynomial is maximal, and $L = K[X]/(X^2+1)$ is an extension field of K which does contain an element whose square is −1 (namely the residue class of X).

By iterating the above construction, one can construct a splitting field of any polynomial from K[X]. This is an extension field L of K in which the given polynomial splits into a product of linear factors.

If p is any prime number and n is a positive integer, there is a unique (up to isomorphism) finite field $GF(p^n) = \mathbb{F}_{p^n}$ with p^{n} elements; this is an extension field of the prime field $\operatorname{GF}(p) = \mathbb{F}_p = \Z/p\Z$ with p elements.

Given a field K, we can consider the field K(X) of all rational functions in the variable X with coefficients in K; the elements of K(X) are fractions of two polynomials over K, and indeed K(X) is the field of fractions of the polynomial ring K[X]. This field of rational functions is an extension field of K. This extension is infinite.

Given a Riemann surface M, the set of all meromorphic functions defined on M is a field, denoted by $\Complex(M).$ It is a transcendental extension field of $\Complex$ if we identify every complex number with the corresponding constant function defined on M. More generally, given an algebraic variety V over some field K, the function field K(V), consisting of the rational functions defined on V, is an extension field of K.

== Algebraic extension ==
An element x of a field extension $L/K$ is algebraic over K if it is a root of a nonzero polynomial with coefficients in K. For example, $\sqrt 2$ is algebraic over the rational numbers, because it is a root of $x^2-2.$ If an element x of L is algebraic over K, the monic polynomial of lowest degree that has x as a root is called the minimal polynomial of x. This minimal polynomial is irreducible over K.

An element s of L is algebraic over K if and only if the simple extension K(s) /K is a finite extension. In this case the degree of the extension equals the degree of the minimal polynomial, and a basis of the K-vector space K(s) consists of $1, s, s^2, \ldots, s^{d-1},$ where d is the degree of the minimal polynomial.

The set of the elements of L that are algebraic over K form a subextension, which is called the algebraic closure of K in L. This results from the preceding characterization: if s and t are algebraic, the extensions K(s) /K and K(s)(t) /K(s) are finite. Thus K(s, t) /K is also finite, as well as the sub extensions K(s ± t) /K, K(st) /K and K(1/s) /K (if s ≠ 0). It follows that s ± t, st and 1/s are all algebraic.

An algebraic extension $L/K$ is an extension such that every element of L is algebraic over K. Equivalently, an algebraic extension is an extension that is generated by algebraic elements. For example, $\Q(\sqrt 2, \sqrt 3)$ is an algebraic extension of $\Q$, because $\sqrt 2$ and $\sqrt 3$ are algebraic over $\Q.$

A simple extension is algebraic if and only if it is finite. This implies that an extension is algebraic if and only if it is the union of its finite subextensions, and that every finite extension is algebraic.

Every field K has an algebraic closure, which is up to an isomorphism the largest extension field of K which is algebraic over K, and also the smallest extension field such that every polynomial with coefficients in K has a root in it. For example, $\Complex$ is an algebraic closure of $\R$, but not an algebraic closure of $\Q$, as it is not algebraic over $\Q$ (for example π is not algebraic over $\Q$).

== Transcendental extension ==
Given a field extension $L/K$, a subset S of L is called algebraically independent over K if no non-trivial polynomial relation with coefficients in K exists among the elements of S. The largest cardinality of an algebraically independent set is called the transcendence degree of L/K. It is always possible to find a set S, algebraically independent over K, such that L/K(S) is algebraic. Such a set S is called a transcendence basis of L/K. All transcendence bases have the same cardinality, equal to the transcendence degree of the extension. An extension $L/K$ is said to be purely transcendental if and only if there exists a transcendence basis S of $L/K$ such that L = K(S). Such an extension has the property that all elements of L except those of K are transcendental over K, but, however, there are extensions with this property which are not purely transcendental—a class of such extensions take the form L/K where both L and K are algebraically closed.

If L/K is purely transcendental and S is a transcendence basis of the extension, it doesn't necessarily follow that L = K(S). On the opposite, even when one knows a transcendence basis, it may be difficult to decide whether the extension is purely separable, and if it is so, it may be difficult to find a transcendence basis S such that L = K(S).

For example, consider the extension $\Q(x, y)/\Q,$ where $x$ is transcendental over $\Q,$ and $y$ is a root of the equation $y^2-x^3=0.$ Such an extension can be defined as $\Q(X)[Y]/\langle Y^2-X^3\rangle,$ in which $x$ and $y$ are the equivalence classes of $X$ and $Y.$ Obviously, the singleton set $\{x\}$ is transcendental over $\Q$ and the extension $\Q(x, y)/\Q(x)$ is algebraic; hence $\{x\}$ is a transcendence basis that does not generate the extension $\Q(x, y)/\Q(x)$. Similarly, $\{y\}$ is a transcendence basis that does not generate the whole extension. However the extension is purely transcendental since, if one set $t=y/x,$ one has $x=t^2$ and $y=t^3,$ and thus $t$ generates the whole extension.

Purely transcendental extensions of an algebraically closed field occur as function fields of rational varieties. The problem of finding a rational parametrization of a rational variety is equivalent with the problem of finding a transcendence basis that generates the whole extension.

== Normal, separable and Galois extensions ==
An algebraic extension $L/K$ is called normal if every irreducible polynomial in K[X] that has a root in L completely factors into linear factors over L. Every algebraic extension F/K admits a normal closure L, which is an extension field of F such that $L/K$ is normal and which is minimal with this property.

An algebraic extension $L/K$ is called separable if the minimal polynomial of every element of L over K is separable, i.e., has no repeated roots in an algebraic closure over K. A Galois extension is a field extension that is both normal and separable.

A consequence of the primitive element theorem states that every finite separable extension has a primitive element (i.e. is simple).

Given any field extension $L/K$, we can consider its automorphism group $\text{Aut}(L/K)$, consisting of all field automorphisms α: L → L with α(x) = x for all x in K. When the extension is Galois this automorphism group is called the Galois group of the extension. Extensions whose Galois group is abelian are called abelian extensions.

For a given field extension $L/K$, one is often interested in the intermediate fields F (subfields of L that contain K). The significance of Galois extensions and Galois groups is that they allow a complete description of the intermediate fields: there is a bijection between the intermediate fields and the subgroups of the Galois group, described by the fundamental theorem of Galois theory.

== Generalizations ==
Field extensions can be generalized to ring extensions which consist of a ring and one of its subrings. A closer non-commutative analog are central simple algebras (CSAs) – ring extensions over a field, which are simple algebra (no non-trivial 2-sided ideals, just as for a field) and where the center of the ring is exactly the field. For example, the only finite field extension of the real numbers is the complex numbers, while the quaternions are a central simple algebra over the reals, and all CSAs over the reals are Brauer equivalent to the reals or the quaternions. CSAs can be further generalized to Azumaya algebras, where the base field is replaced by a commutative local ring.

== Extension of scalars ==
Given a field extension, one can "extend scalars" on associated algebraic objects. For example, given a real vector space, one can produce a complex vector space via complexification. In addition to vector spaces, one can perform extension of scalars for associative algebras defined over the field, such as polynomials or group algebras and the associated group representations. Extension of scalars of polynomials is often used implicitly, by just considering the coefficients as being elements of a larger field, but may also be considered more formally. Extension of scalars has numerous applications, as discussed in extension of scalars: applications.

== See also ==
- Field theory
- Glossary of field theory
- Tower of fields
- Primary extension
- Regular extension
