= Fundamental theorem of algebra =

Every polynomial has a real or complex root

The fundamental theorem of algebra, also called d'Alembert's theorem or the d'Alembert–Gauss theorem, states that every non-constant single-variable polynomial with complex coefficients has at least one complex root. This includes polynomials with real coefficients, since every real number is a complex number with its imaginary part equal to zero.

Equivalently (by definition), the theorem states that the field of complex numbers is algebraically closed.

The theorem is also stated as follows: every non-zero, single-variable, degree n polynomial with complex coefficients has, counted with multiplicity, exactly n complex roots. The equivalence of the two statements can be proven through the use of successive polynomial division.

Despite its name, it is not fundamental for modern algebra; it was named when algebra was synonymous with the theory of equations. Additionally, the theorem cannot be proven with purely algebraic methods; since it requires, for example, the intermediate value theorem, which, in this case, requires the continuity of polynomial functions.

== History ==
Peter Roth, in his book Arithmetica Philosophica (published in 1608, at Nürnberg, by Johann Lantzenberger), wrote that a polynomial equation of degree n (with real coefficients) may have n solutions. Albert Girard, in his book L'invention nouvelle en l'Algèbre (published in 1629), asserted that a polynomial equation of degree n has n solutions, but he did not state that they had to be real numbers. Furthermore, he added that his assertion holds "unless the equation is incomplete", where "incomplete" means that at least one coefficient is equal to 0. However, when he explains in detail what he means, it is clear that he actually believes that his assertion is always true; for instance, he shows that the equation $x^4 = 4x-3,$ although incomplete, has four solutions (counting multiplicities): 1 (twice), $-1+i\sqrt{2},$ and $-1-i\sqrt{2}.$

As will be mentioned again below, it follows from the fundamental theorem of algebra that every non-constant polynomial with real coefficients can be written as a product of polynomials with real coefficients whose degrees are either 1 or 2. However, in 1702 Leibniz erroneously said that no polynomial of the type x^{4} + a^{4} (with a real and distinct from 0) can be written in such a way. Later, Nikolaus Bernoulli made the same assertion concerning the polynomial x^{4} − 4x^{3} + 2x^{2} + 4x + 4, but he got a letter from Euler in 1742 in which it was shown that this polynomial is equal to
$$\left (x^2-(2+\alpha)x+1+\sqrt{7}+\alpha \right ) \left (x^2-(2-\alpha)x+1+\sqrt{7}-\alpha \right ),$$
with $\alpha = \sqrt{4+2\sqrt{7}}.$ Euler also pointed out that
$$x^4+a^4= \left (x^2+a\sqrt{2}\cdot x+a^2 \right ) \left (x^2-a\sqrt{2}\cdot x+a^2 \right ).$$

A first attempt at proving the theorem was made by d'Alembert in 1746, but his proof was incomplete. Among other problems, it assumed implicitly a theorem (now known as Puiseux's theorem), which would not be proved until more than a century later and using the fundamental theorem of algebra. Other attempts were made by Euler (1749), de Foncenex (1759), Lagrange (1772), and Laplace (1795). These last four attempts assumed implicitly Girard's assertion; to be more precise, the existence of solutions was assumed and all that remained to be proved was that their form was a + bi for some real numbers a and b. In modern terms, Euler, de Foncenex, Lagrange, and Laplace were assuming the existence of a splitting field of the polynomial p(z).

At the end of the 18th century, two new proofs were published which did not assume the existence of roots, but neither of which was complete. One of them, due to James Wood and mainly algebraic, was published in 1798 and it was totally ignored. Wood's proof had an algebraic gap. The other one was published by Gauss in 1799 and it was mainly geometric, but it had a topological gap, only filled by Alexander Ostrowski in 1920, as discussed in Smale (1981).

The first rigorous proof was published by Argand, an amateur mathematician, in 1806 (and revisited in 1813); it was also here that, for the first time, the fundamental theorem of algebra was stated for polynomials with complex coefficients, rather than just real coefficients. Gauss produced two other proofs in 1816 and another incomplete version of his original proof in 1849.

The first textbook containing a proof of the theorem was Cauchy's Cours d'analyse de l'École Royale Polytechnique (1821). It contained Argand's proof, although Argand is not credited for it.

None of the proofs mentioned so far is constructive. It was Weierstrass who raised for the first time, in the middle of the 19th century, the problem of finding a constructive proof of the fundamental theorem of algebra. He presented his solution, which amounts in modern terms to a combination of the Durand–Kerner method with the homotopy continuation principle, in 1891. Another proof of this kind was obtained by Hellmuth Kneser in 1940 and simplified by his son Martin Kneser in 1981.

Without using countable choice, it is not possible to constructively prove the fundamental theorem of algebra for complex numbers based on the Dedekind real numbers (which are not constructively equivalent to the Cauchy real numbers without countable choice). However, Fred Richman proved a reformulated version of the theorem that does work.

== Equivalent statements ==
There are several equivalent formulations of the theorem:

- Every univariate polynomial of positive degree with real coefficients has at least one complex root.
- Every univariate polynomial of positive degree with complex coefficients has at least one complex root.
  This implies immediately the previous assertion, as real numbers are also complex numbers. The converse results from the fact that one gets a polynomial with real coefficients by taking the product of a polynomial and its complex conjugate (obtained by replacing each coefficient with its complex conjugate). A root of this product is either a root of the given polynomial, or of its conjugate; in the latter case, the conjugate of this root is a root of the given polynomial.
- Every univariate polynomial of positive degree n with complex coefficients can be factorized as
  $$c(x-r_1)\cdots(x-r_n),$$
  where $c, r_1, \ldots, r_n$ are complex numbers.
  The n complex numbers $r_1, \ldots, r_n$ are the roots of the polynomial. If a root appears in several factors, it is a multiple root, and the number of its occurrences is, by definition, the multiplicity of the root.
  The proof that this statement results from the previous ones is done by recursion on n: when a root $r_1$ has been found, the polynomial division by $x-r_1$ provides a polynomial of degree $n-1$ whose roots are the other roots of the given polynomial.

The next two statements are equivalent to the previous ones, although they do not involve any nonreal complex number. These statements can be proved from previous factorizations by remarking that, if r is a non-real root of a polynomial with real coefficients, its complex conjugate $\overline r$ is also a root, and $(x-r)(x-\overline r)$ is a polynomial of degree two with real coefficients (this is the complex conjugate root theorem). Conversely, if one has a factor of degree two, the quadratic formula gives a root.

- Every univariate polynomial with real coefficients of degree larger than two has a factor of degree two with real coefficients.
- Every univariate polynomial with real coefficients of positive degree can be factored as
  $$cp_1\cdots p_k,$$
  where c is a real number and each $p_i$ is a monic polynomial of degree at most two with real coefficients. Moreover, one can suppose that the factors of degree two do not have any real root.

== Proofs ==
All proofs below involve some mathematical analysis, or at least the topological concept of continuity of real or complex functions. Some also use differentiable or even analytic functions. This requirement has led to the remark that the Fundamental Theorem of Algebra is neither fundamental, nor a theorem of algebra.

Some proofs of the theorem only prove that any non-constant polynomial with real coefficients has some complex root. This lemma is enough to establish the general case because, given a non-constant polynomial p with complex coefficients, the polynomial
$$q=p\overline{p},$$
has only real coefficients, and, if z is a root of q, then either z or its conjugate is a root of p. Here, $\overline{p}$ is the polynomial obtained by replacing each coefficient of p with its complex conjugate; the roots of $\overline{p}$ are exactly the complex conjugates of the roots of p.

Many non-algebraic proofs of the theorem use the fact (sometimes called the "growth lemma") that a polynomial function p(z) of degree n whose dominant coefficient is 1 behaves like z^{n} when |z| is large enough. More precisely, there is some positive real number R such that
$$\tfrac{1}{2}|z^n|<|p(z)|<\tfrac{3}{2}|z^n|$$
when |z| > R.

=== Real-analytic proofs ===
Even without using complex numbers, it is possible to show that a real-valued polynomial p(x): p(0) ≠ 0 of degree n > 2 can always be divided by some quadratic polynomial with real coefficients. In other words, for some real-valued a and b, the coefficients of the linear remainder on dividing p(x) by x^{2} − ax − b simultaneously become zero.

$$p(x) = (x^2 - ax - b) q(x) + x\,R_{p(x)}(a, b) + S_{p(x)}(a, b),$$
where q(x) is a polynomial of degree n − 2. The coefficients R_{p(x)}(a, b) and S_{p(x)}(a, b) are independent of x and completely defined by the coefficients of p(x). In terms of representation, R_{p(x)}(a, b) and S_{p(x)}(a, b) are bivariate polynomials in a and b. In the flavor of Gauss's first (incomplete) proof of this theorem from 1799, the key is to show that for any sufficiently large negative value of b, all the roots of both R_{p(x)}(a, b) and S_{p(x)}(a, b) in the variable a are real-valued and alternating each other (interlacing property). Utilizing a Sturm-like chain that contain R_{p(x)}(a, b) and S_{p(x)}(a, b) as consecutive terms, interlacing in the variable a can be shown for all consecutive pairs in the chain whenever b has sufficiently large negative value. As S_{p}(a, b = 0) = p(0) has no roots, interlacing of R_{p(x)}(a, b) and S_{p(x)}(a, b) in the variable a fails at b = 0. Topological arguments can be applied on the interlacing property to show that the locus of the roots of R_{p(x)}(a, b) and S_{p(x)}(a, b) must intersect for some real-valued a and b < 0.

Sheldon Axler has a proof of the fundamental theorem of algebra using De Moivre's formula and extreme value theorem on a compact set in a textbook called Linear Algebra Done Right.

=== Complex-analytic proofs ===
Find a closed disk D of radius r centered at the origin such that |p(z)| > |p(0)| whenever |z| ≥ r. The minimum of |p(z)| on D, which must exist since D is compact, is therefore achieved at some point z_{0} in the interior of D, but not at any point of its boundary. The maximum modulus principle applied to 1/p(z) implies that p(z_{0}) = 0. In other words, z_{0} is a zero of p(z).

A variation of this proof does not require the maximum modulus principle (in fact, a similar argument also gives a proof of the maximum modulus principle for holomorphic functions). Continuing from before the principle was invoked, if a := p(z_{0}) ≠ 0, then, expanding p(z) in powers of z − z_{0}, we can write
$$p(z) = a + c_k (z-z_0)^k + c_{k+1} (z-z_0)^{k+1} + \cdots + c_n (z-z_0)^n.$$

Here, the c_{j} are simply the coefficients of the polynomial z → p(z + z_{0}) after expansion, and k is the index of the first non-zero coefficient following the constant term. For z sufficiently close to z_{0} this function has behavior asymptotically similar to the simpler polynomial $q(z) = a+c_k (z-z_0)^k$. More precisely, the function
$$\left|\frac{p(z)-q(z)}{(z-z_0)^{k+1}}\right|\leq M$$
for some positive constant M in some neighborhood of z_{0}. Therefore, if we define $\theta_0 = (\arg(a)+\pi-\arg(c_k)) /k$ and let $z = z_0 + r e^{i \theta_0}$ tracing a circle of radius r > 0 around z, then for any sufficiently small r (so that the bound M holds), we see that
$$\begin{align}
|p(z)| &\le |q(z)| + r^{k+1} \left|\frac{p(z)-q(z)}{r^{k+1}}\right|\\[4pt]
&\le \left|a +(-1)c_k r^k e^{i(\arg(a)-\arg(c_k))}\right| + M r^{k+1} \\[4pt]
&= |a|-|c_k|r^k + M r^{k+1}
\end{align}$$

When r is sufficiently close to 0 this upper bound for |p(z)| is strictly smaller than |a|, contradicting the definition of z_{0}. Geometrically, we have found an explicit direction θ_{0} such that if one approaches z_{0} from that direction one can obtain values p(z) smaller in absolute value than |p(z_{0})|.

Another analytic proof can be obtained along this line of thought observing that, since |p(z)| > |p(0)| outside D, the minimum of |p(z)| on the whole complex plane is achieved at z_{0}. If |p(z_{0})| > 0, then 1/p is a bounded holomorphic function in the entire complex plane since, for each complex number z, |1/p(z)| ≤ |1/p(z_{0})|. Applying Liouville's theorem, which states that a bounded entire function must be constant, this would imply that 1/p is constant and therefore that p is constant. This gives a contradiction, and hence p(z_{0}) = 0.

Yet another analytic proof uses the argument principle. Let R be a positive real number large enough so that every root of p(z) has absolute value smaller than R; such a number must exist because every non-constant polynomial function of degree n has at most n zeros. For each r > R, consider the number
$$\frac{1}{2\pi i}\int_{c(r)}\frac{p'(z)}{p(z)}\,dz,$$
where c(r) is the circle centered at 0 with radius r oriented counterclockwise; then the argument principle says that this number is the number N of zeros of p(z) in the open ball centered at 0 with radius r, which, since r > R, is the total number of zeros of p(z). On the other hand, the integral of n/z along c(r) divided by 2πi is equal to n. But the difference between the two numbers is
$$\frac{1}{2\pi i}\int_{c(r)}\left(\frac{p'(z)}{p(z)}-\frac{n}{z}\right)dz=\frac{1}{2\pi i}\int_{c(r)}\frac{zp'(z)-np(z)}{zp(z)}\,dz.$$

The numerator of the rational expression being integrated has degree at most n − 1 and the degree of the denominator is n + 1. Therefore, the number above tends to 0 as r → +∞. But the number is also equal to N − n and so N = n.

Another complex-analytic proof can be given by combining linear algebra with the Cauchy theorem. To establish that every complex polynomial of degree n > 0 has a zero, it suffices to show that every complex square matrix of size n > 0 has a (complex) eigenvalue. The proof of the latter statement is by contradiction.

Let A be a complex square matrix of size n > 0 and let I_{n} be the unit matrix of the same size. Assume A has no eigenvalues. Consider the resolvent function
$$R(z)=(zI_n-A)^{-1},$$
which is a meromorphic function on the complex plane with values in the vector space of matrices. The eigenvalues of A are precisely the poles of R(z). Since, by assumption, A has no eigenvalues, the function R(z) is an entire function and Cauchy theorem implies that
$$\int_{c(r)} R(z) \, dz =0.$$

On the other hand, R(z) expanded as a geometric series gives:
$$R(z)=z^{-1}(I_n-z^{-1}A)^{-1}=z^{-1}\sum_{k=0}^\infty \frac{1}{z^k}A^k\cdot$$

This formula is valid outside the closed disc of radius $\|A\|$ (the operator norm of A). Let $r>\|A\|.$ Then
$$\int_{c(r)}R(z)dz=\sum_{k=0}^{\infty}\int_{c(r)}\frac{dz}{z^{k+1}}A^k=2\pi iI_n$$
(in which only the summand k = 0 has a nonzero integral). This is a contradiction, and so A has an eigenvalue.

Finally, Rouché's theorem gives perhaps the shortest proof of the theorem.

=== Topological proofs ===
Animation illustrating the proof on the polynomial x^{5} − x − 1

Suppose the minimum of |p(z)| on the whole complex plane is achieved at z_{0}; it was seen at the proof which uses Liouville's theorem that such a number must exist. We can write p(z) as a polynomial in z − z_{0}: there is some natural number k and there are some complex numbers c_{k}, c_{k + 1}, ..., c_{n} such that c_{k} ≠ 0 and:
$$p(z)=p(z_0)+c_k(z-z_0)^k+c_{k+1}(z-z_0)^{k+1}+ \cdots +c_n(z-z_0)^n.$$

If p(z_{0}) is nonzero, it follows that if a is a k^{th} root of −p(z_{0})/c_{k} and if t is positive and sufficiently small, then |p(z_{0} + ta)| < |p(z_{0})|, which is impossible, since |p(z_{0})| is the minimum of |p| on D.

For another topological proof by contradiction, suppose that the polynomial p(z) has no roots, and consequently is never equal to 0. Think of the polynomial as a map from the complex plane into the complex plane. It maps any circle |z| = R into a closed loop, a curve P(R). We will consider what happens to the winding number of P(R) at the extremes when R is very large and when R = 0. When R is a sufficiently large number, then the leading term z^{n} of p(z) dominates all other terms combined; in other words,
$$\left | z^n \right | > \left | a_{n-1} z^{n-1} + \cdots + a_0 \right |.$$

When z traverses the circle $Re^{i\theta}$ once counter-clockwise $(0\leq \theta \leq 2\pi),$ then $z^n=R^ne^{in\theta}$ winds n times counter-clockwise $(0\leq \theta \leq 2\pi n)$ around the origin (0,0), and P(R) likewise. At the other extreme, with |z| = 0, the curve P(0) is merely the single point p(0), which must be nonzero because p(z) is never zero. Thus p(0) must be distinct from the origin (0,0), which denotes 0 in the complex plane. The winding number of P(0) around the origin (0,0) is thus 0. Now changing R continuously will deform the loop continuously. At some R the winding number must change. But that can only happen if the curve P(R) includes the origin (0,0) for some R. But then for some z on that circle |z| = R we have p(z) = 0, contradicting our original assumption. Therefore, p(z) has at least one zero.

=== Algebraic proofs ===
These proofs of the Fundamental Theorem of Algebra must make use of the following two facts about real numbers that are not algebraic but require only a small amount of analysis (more precisely, the intermediate value theorem in both cases):

- every polynomial with an odd degree and real coefficients has some real root;
- every non-negative real number has a square root.

The second fact, together with the quadratic formula, implies the theorem for real quadratic polynomials. In other words, algebraic proofs of the fundamental theorem actually show that if R is any real-closed field, then its extension C = R(√−1) is algebraically closed.

==== By induction ====
As mentioned above, it suffices to check the statement "every non-constant polynomial p(z) with real coefficients has a complex root". This statement can be proved by induction on the greatest non-negative integer k such that 2^{k} divides the degree n of p(z). Let a be the coefficient of z^{n} in p(z) and let F be a splitting field of p(z) over C; in other words, the field F contains C and there are elements z_{1}, z_{2}, ..., z_{n} in F such that
$$p(z)=a(z-z_1)(z-z_2) \cdots (z-z_n).$$

If k = 0, then n is odd, and therefore p(z) has a real root. Now, suppose that n = 2^{k}m (with m odd and k > 0) and that the theorem is already proved when the degree of the polynomial has the form 2^{k − 1}m′ with m′ odd. For a real number t, define:
$$q_t(z)=\prod_{1\le i<j\le n}\left(z-z_i-z_j-tz_iz_j\right).$$

Then the coefficients of q_{t}(z) are symmetric polynomials in the z_{i} with real coefficients. Therefore, they can be expressed as polynomials with real coefficients in the elementary symmetric polynomials, that is, in −a_{1}, a_{2}, ..., (−1)^{n}a_{n}. So q_{t}(z) has in fact real coefficients. Furthermore, the degree of q_{t}(z) is n(n − 1)/2 = 2^{k−1}m(n − 1), and m(n − 1) is an odd number. So, using the induction hypothesis, q_{t} has at least one complex root; in other words, z_{i} + z_{j} + tz_{i}z_{j} is complex for two distinct elements i and j from {1, ..., n}. Since there are more real numbers than pairs (i, j), one can find distinct real numbers t and s such that z_{i} + z_{j} + tz_{i}z_{j} and z_{i} + z_{j} + sz_{i}z_{j} are complex (for the same i and j). So, both z_{i} + z_{j} and z_{i}z_{j} are complex numbers. It is easy to check that every complex number has a complex square root, thus every complex polynomial of degree 2 has a complex root by the quadratic formula. It follows that z_{i} and z_{j} are complex numbers, since they are roots of the quadratic polynomial z^{2} − (z_{i} + z_{j})z + z_{i}z_{j}.

Joseph Shipman showed in 2007 that the assumption that odd degree polynomials have roots is stronger than necessary; any field in which polynomials of prime degree have roots is algebraically closed (so "odd" can be replaced by "odd prime" and this holds for fields of all characteristics). For axiomatization of algebraically closed fields, this is the best possible, as there are counterexamples if a single prime is excluded. However, these counterexamples rely on −1 having a square root. If we take a field where −1 has no square root, and every polynomial of degree n ∈ I has a root, where I is any fixed infinite set of odd numbers, then every polynomial f(x) of odd degree has a root (since (x^{2} + 1)^{k}f(x) has a root, where k is chosen so that deg(f) + 2k ∈ I).

==== From Galois theory ====
Another algebraic proof of the fundamental theorem can be given using Galois theory. It suffices to show that C has no proper finite field extension. Let K/C be a finite extension. Since the normal closure of K over R still has a finite degree over C (or R), we may assume without loss of generality that K is a normal extension of R (hence it is a Galois extension, as every algebraic extension of a field of characteristic 0 is separable). Let G be the Galois group of this extension, and let H be a Sylow 2-subgroup of G, so that the order of H is a power of 2, and the index of H in G is odd. By the fundamental theorem of Galois theory, there exists a subextension L of K/R such that Gal(K/L) = H. As [L:R] = [G:H] is odd, and there are no nonlinear irreducible real polynomials of odd degree, we must have L = R, thus [K:R] and [K:C] are powers of 2. Assuming by way of contradiction that [K:C] > 1, we conclude that the 2-group Gal(K/C) contains a subgroup of index 2, so there exists a subextension M of C of degree 2. However, C has no extension of degree 2, because every quadratic complex polynomial has a complex root, as mentioned above. This shows that [K:C] = 1, and therefore K = C, which completes the proof.

=== Geometric proofs ===
There exists still another way to approach the fundamental theorem of algebra, due to J. M. Almira and A. Romero: by Riemannian geometric arguments. The main idea here is to prove that the existence of a non-constant polynomial p(z) without zeros implies the existence of a flat Riemannian metric over the sphere S^{2}. This leads to a contradiction since the sphere is not flat.

A Riemannian surface (M, g) is said to be flat if its Gaussian curvature, which we denote by K_{g}, is identically null. Now, the Gauss–Bonnet theorem, when applied to the sphere S^{2}, claims that
$$\int_{\mathbf{S}^2}K_g=4\pi,$$
which proves that the sphere is not flat.

Let us now assume that n > 0 and
$$p(z) = a_0 + a_1 z + \cdots + a_n z^n \neq 0$$
for each complex number z. Let us define
$$p^*(z) = z^n p \left ( \tfrac{1}{z} \right ) = a_0 z^n + a_1 z^{n-1} + \cdots + a_n.$$

Obviously, p*(z) ≠ 0 for all z in C. Consider the polynomial f(z) = p(z)p*(z). Then f(z) ≠ 0 for each z in C. Furthermore,
$$f(\tfrac{1}{w}) = p \left (\tfrac{1}{w} \right )p^* \left (\tfrac{1}{w} \right ) = w^{-2n}p^*(w)p(w) = w^{-2n}f(w).$$

We can use this functional equation to prove that g, given by
$$g=\frac{1}{|f(w)|^{\frac{2}{n}}}\,|dw|^2$$
for w in C, and
$$g=\frac{1}{\left |f\left (\tfrac{1}{w} \right ) \right |^{\frac{2}{n}}}\left |d\left (\tfrac{1}{w} \right ) \right |^2$$
for w ∈ S^{2}\{0}, is a well defined Riemannian metric over the sphere S^{2} (which we identify with the extended complex plane C ∪ {∞}).

Now, a simple computation shows that
$$\forall w\in\mathbf{C}: \qquad  \frac{1}{|f(w)|^{\frac{1}{n}}} K_g=\frac{1}{n}\Delta \log|f(w)|=\frac{1}{n}\Delta \text{Re}(\log f(w))=0,$$
since the real part of an analytic function is harmonic. This proves that K_{g} = 0.

== Corollaries ==
Since the fundamental theorem of algebra can be seen as the statement that the field of complex numbers is algebraically closed, it follows that any theorem concerning algebraically closed fields applies to the field of complex numbers. Here are a few more consequences of the theorem, which are either about the field of real numbers or the relationship between the field of real numbers and the field of complex numbers:

- The field of complex numbers is the algebraic closure of the field of real numbers.
- Every polynomial in one variable z with complex coefficients is the product of a complex constant and polynomials of the form z + a with a complex.
- Every polynomial in one variable x with real coefficients can be uniquely written as the product of a constant, polynomials of the form x + a with a real, and polynomials of the form x^{2} + ax + b with a and b real and a^{2} − 4b < 0 (which is the same thing as saying that the polynomial x^{2} + ax + b has no real roots). (By the Abel–Ruffini theorem, the real numbers a and b are not necessarily expressible in terms of the coefficients of the polynomial, the basic arithmetic operations and the extraction of n-th roots.) This implies that the number of non-real complex roots is always even and remains even when counted with their multiplicity.
- Every rational function in one variable x, with real coefficients, can be written as the sum of a polynomial function with rational functions of the form a/(x − b)^{n} (where n is a natural number, and a and b are real numbers), and rational functions of the form (ax + b)/(x^{2} + cx + d)^{n} (where n is a natural number, and a, b, c, and d are real numbers such that c^{2} − 4d < 0). A corollary of this is that every rational function in one variable and real coefficients has an elementary primitive.
- Every algebraic extension of the real field is isomorphic either to the real field or to the complex field.

== Bounds on the zeros of a polynomial ==
While the fundamental theorem of algebra states a general existence result, it is of some interest, both from the theoretical and from the practical point of view, to have information on the location of the zeros of a given polynomial. The simplest result in this direction is a bound on the modulus: all zeros ζ of a monic polynomial $z^n+a_{n-1}z^{n-1}+\cdots+a_1z +a_0$ satisfy an inequality |ζ| ≤ R_{∞}, where
$$R_{\infty}:= 1+\max\{|a_0|,\ldots,|a_{n-1}|\}.$$

As stated, this is not yet an existence result but rather an example of what is called an a priori bound: it says that if there are solutions then they lie inside the closed disk of center the origin and radius R_{∞}. However, once coupled with the fundamental theorem of algebra it says that the disk contains in fact at least one solution. More generally, a bound can be given directly in terms of any p-norm of the n-vector of coefficients $a:=( a_0, a_1, \ldots, a_{n-1}),$ that is |ζ| ≤ R_{p}, where R_{p} is precisely the q-norm of the 2-vector $(1, \|a\|_p),$ q being the conjugate exponent of p, $\tfrac{1}{p} + \tfrac{1}{q} =1,$ for any 1 ≤ p ≤ ∞. Thus, the modulus of any solution is also bounded by
$$R_1:= \max\left \{ 1 , \sum_{0\leq k<n} |a_k|\right \},$$
$$R_p:= \left[ 1 + \left(\sum_{0\leq k<n}|a_k|^p\right )^{\frac{q}{p}}\right ]^{\frac{1}{q}},$$
for 1 < p < ∞, and in particular
$$R_2:= \sqrt{\sum_{0\leq k\leq n} |a_k|^2 }$$
(where we define a_{n} to mean 1, which is reasonable since 1 is indeed the n-th coefficient of our polynomial). The case of a generic polynomial of degree n,
$$P(z):= a_n z^n+a_{n-1}z^{n-1}+\cdots+a_1z +a_0,$$
is of course reduced to the case of a monic, dividing all coefficients by a_{n} ≠ 0. Also, in case that 0 is not a root, i.e. a_{0} ≠ 0, bounds from below on the roots ζ follow immediately as bounds from above on $\tfrac{1}{\zeta}$, that is, the roots of
$$a_0 z^n+a_1z^{n-1}+\cdots+a_{n-1}z +a_n.$$

Finally, the distance $|\zeta-\zeta_0|$ from the roots ζ to any point $\zeta_0$ can be estimated from below and above, seeing $\zeta-\zeta_0$ as zeros of the polynomial $P(z+\zeta_0)$, whose coefficients are the Taylor expansion of P(z) at $z=\zeta_0.$

Let ζ be a root of the polynomial
$$z^n+a_{n-1}z^{n-1}+\cdots+a_1z +a_0;$$
in order to prove the inequality |ζ| ≤ R_{p} we can assume, of course, |ζ| > 1. Writing the equation as
$$-\zeta^n=a_{n-1}\zeta^{n-1}+\cdots+a_1\zeta+a_0,$$
and using the Hölder's inequality we find
$$|\zeta|^n\leq \|a\|_p \left \| \left (\zeta^{n-1},\ldots,\zeta, 1 \right ) \right \|_q.$$

Now, if p = 1, this is
$$|\zeta|^n\leq\|a\|_1\max \left \{|\zeta|^{n-1},\ldots,|\zeta|,1 \right \} =\|a\|_1|\zeta|^{n-1},$$
thus
$$|\zeta|\leq \max\{1, \|a\|_1\}.$$

In the case 1 < p ≤ ∞, taking into account the summation formula for a geometric progression, we have
$$|\zeta|^n\leq \|a\|_p \left(|\zeta|^{q(n-1)}+\cdots+|\zeta|^q +1\right)^{\frac{1}{q}}=\|a\|_p \left(\frac{|\zeta|^{qn}-1}{|\zeta|^q-1}\right)^{\frac{1}{q}}\leq\|a\|_p \left(\frac{|\zeta|^{qn}}{|\zeta|^q-1}\right)^{\frac{1}{q}},$$
thus
$$|\zeta|^{nq}\leq \|a\|_p^q \frac{|\zeta|^{qn}}{|\zeta|^q-1}$$
and simplifying,
$$|\zeta|^q\leq 1+\|a\|_p^q.$$

Therefore
$$|\zeta|\leq \left \| \left (1,\|a\|_p \right ) \right \|_q=R_p$$
holds, for all 1 ≤ p ≤ ∞.

== See also ==
- Weierstrass factorization theorem, a generalization of the theorem to other entire functions
- Eilenberg–Niven theorem, a generalization of the theorem to polynomials with quaternionic coefficients and variables
- Hilbert's Nullstellensatz, a generalization to several variables of the assertion that complex roots exist
- Bézout's theorem, a generalization to several variables of the assertion on the number of roots.
