= Demushkin =

Demushkin, Dyemushkin or Dyomushkin (Russian: Дёмушкин) may refer to

- Demushkin group in mathematical group theory
- Dmitry Demushkin (born 1979), Russian politician and public figure
