= Composite field (mathematics) =

A composite field or compositum of fields is an object of study in field theory. Let K be a field, and let $E_1$, $E_2$ be subfields of K. Then the (internal) composite of $E_1$ and $E_2$ is the field defined as the intersection of all subfields of K containing both $E_1$ and $E_2$. The composite is commonly denoted $E_1E_2$.

== Properties ==
Equivalently to intersections we can define the composite $E_1E_2$ to be the smallest subfield of K that contains both $E_1$ and $E_2$. While for the definition via intersection, well-definedness hinges only on the property that intersections of fields are themselves fields, here two auxiliary assertions are included. Firstly, that there exist minimal subfields of K that include $E_1$ and $E_2$ and secondly, that such a minimal subfield is unique and therefore justly called the smallest.

It also can be defined using field of fractions

$$E_1E_2=E_1(E_2)=E_2(E_1),$$

where $F(S)$ is the set of all $F$-rational expressions in finitely many elements of $S$.

Let $L\subseteq E_1\cap E_2$ be a common subfield and $E_1/L$ a Galois extension then $E_1E_2/E_2$ and $E_1/(E_1\cap E_2)$ are both also Galois and there is an isomorphism given by restriction

$$\text{Gal}(E_1E_2/E_2)\rightarrow\text{Gal}(E_1/(E_1\cap E_2)), \sigma\mapsto\sigma|_{E_1}.$$

For finite field extension this can be explicitly found in Milne and for infinite extensions this follows since infinite Galois extensions are precisely those extensions that are unions of an (infinite) set of finite Galois extensions.

If additionally $E_2/L$ is a Galois extension then $E_1E_2/L$ and $(E_1\cap E_2)/L$ are both also Galois and the map

$$\psi:\text{Gal}(E_1E_2/L)\rightarrow\text{Gal}(E_1/L)\times\text{Gal}(E_2/L), \sigma\mapsto(\sigma|_{E_1},\sigma|_{E_2})$$

is a group homomorphism which is an isomorphism onto the subgroup

$$H=\{(\sigma_1,\sigma_2):\sigma_1|_{E_1\cap E_2}=\sigma_2|_{E_1\cap E_2}\}=\text{Gal}(E_1/L)\times_{\text{Gal}((E_1\cap E_2)/L)}\text{Gal}(E_2/L)\subseteq\text{Gal}(E_1/L)\times\text{Gal}(E_2/L).$$

See Milne.

Both properties are particularly useful for $L=E_1\cap E_2$ and their statements simplify accordingly in this special case. In particular $\psi$ is always an isomorphism in this case.

== External composite ==
When $E_1$ and $E_2$ are not regarded as subfields of a common field then the (external) composite is defined using the tensor product of fields. Note that some care has to be taken for the choice of the common subfield over which this tensor product is performed, otherwise the tensor product might come out to be only an algebra which is not a field.

== Generalizations ==
If $\mathcal{E}=\left\{E_i:i\in I\right\}$ is a set of subfields of a fixed field K indexed by the set I, the generalized composite field can be defined via the intersection

$$\bigvee_{i\in I}E_i = \bigcap_{F\subseteq K\text{ s.t. }\forall i \in I: E_i\subseteq F}F.$$
