= Galois extension =

Algebraic field extension

In mathematics, a Galois extension is an algebraic field extension E/F that is normal and separable; or equivalently, E/F is algebraic, and the field fixed by the automorphism group Aut(E/F) is precisely the base field F. The significance of being a Galois extension is that the extension has a Galois group and obeys the fundamental theorem of Galois theory. (Note: See the article Galois group for definitions of some of these terms and some examples.)

A result of Emil Artin allows one to construct Galois extensions as follows: If E is a given field, and G is a finite group of automorphisms of E with fixed field F, then E/F is a Galois extension.

The property of an extension being Galois behaves well with respect to field composition and intersection.

== Characterization of Galois extensions ==
An important theorem of Emil Artin states that for a finite extension $E/F$, each of the following statements is equivalent to the statement that $E/F$ is Galois:

- $E/F$ is a normal extension and a separable extension.
- $E$ is a splitting field of a set of separable polynomials with coefficients in $F$.
- $|\!\operatorname{Aut}(E/F)| = [E:F]$, that is, the number of automorphisms equals the degree of the extension.

Other equivalent statements are:

- Every irreducible polynomial in $F[x]$ with at least one root in $E$ splits over $E$ and is separable.
- $|\!\operatorname{Aut}(E/F)| \geq [E:F]$, that is, the number of automorphisms is at least the degree of the extension.
- $F$ is the fixed field of a subgroup of $\operatorname{Aut}(E)$.
- $F$ is the fixed field of $\operatorname{Aut}(E/F)$.
- There is a one-to-one correspondence between subfields of $E/F$ and subgroups of $\operatorname{Aut}(E/F)$.

An infinite field extension $E/F$ is Galois if and only if $E$ is the union of finite Galois subextensions $E_i/F$ indexed by an (infinite) index set $I$, i.e. $E=\bigcup_{i\in I}E_i$ and the Galois group is an inverse limit $\operatorname{Aut}(E/F)=\varprojlim_{i\in I}{\operatorname{Aut}(E_i/F)}$ where the inverse system is ordered by field inclusion $E_i\subset E_j$.

== Examples ==
There are two basic ways to construct examples of Galois extensions.

- Take any field $E$, any finite subgroup of $\operatorname{Aut}(E)$, and let $F$ be the fixed field.
- Take any field $F$, any separable polynomial in $F[x]$, and let $E$ be its splitting field.

Adjoining to the rational number field the square root of 2 gives a Galois extension, while adjoining the cubic root of 2 gives a non-Galois extension. Both these extensions are separable, because they have characteristic zero. The first of them is the splitting field of $x^2 -2$; the second has normal closure that includes the complex cubic roots of unity, and so is not a splitting field. In fact, it has no automorphism other than the identity, because it is contained in the real numbers and $x^3 -2$ has just one real root. For more detailed examples, see the page on the fundamental theorem of Galois theory.

An algebraic closure $\bar K$ of an arbitrary field $K$ is Galois over $K$ if and only if $K$ is a perfect field.
