= Algebraic extension =

Extension of a mathematical field with polynomial roots

In mathematics, an algebraic extension is a field extension L/K such that every element of the larger field L is algebraic over the smaller field K; that is, every element of L is a root of a non-zero polynomial with coefficients in K. A field extension that is not algebraic, is said to be transcendental, and must contain transcendental elements, that is, elements that are not algebraic.

The finite algebraic extensions of the field $\Q$ of the rational numbers are called algebraic number fields and are the main objects of study of algebraic number theory. Another example of a common algebraic extension is the extension $\Complex/\R$ of the real numbers by the complex numbers.

== Some properties ==
All transcendental extensions are of infinite degree. This in turn implies that all finite extensions are algebraic. The converse is not true however: there are infinite extensions which are algebraic. For instance, the field of all algebraic numbers is an infinite algebraic extension of the rational numbers.

Let E be an extension field of K, and a ∈ E. The smallest subfield of E that contains K and a is commonly denoted $K(a).$ If a is algebraic over K, then the elements of K(a) can be expressed as polynomials in a with coefficients in K; that is, $K(a)=K[a]$, the smallest ring containing K and a. In this case, $K(a)$ is a finite extension of K and all its elements are algebraic over K. In particular, $K(a)$ is a K-vector space with basis $\{1,a,...,a^{d-1}\}$, where d is the degree of the minimal polynomial of a. These properties do not hold if a is not algebraic. For example, $\Q(\pi)\neq \Q[\pi],$ and they are both infinite dimensional vector spaces over $\Q.$

An algebraically closed field F has no proper algebraic extensions, that is, no algebraic extensions E with F < E. An example is the field of complex numbers. Every field has an algebraic extension which is algebraically closed (called its algebraic closure), but proving this in general requires some form of the axiom of choice.

An extension L/K is algebraic if and only if every sub K-algebra of L is a field.

== Properties ==
The following three properties hold:

1. If E is an algebraic extension of F and F is an algebraic extension of K then E is an algebraic extension of K.
2. If E and F are algebraic extensions of K in a common overfield C, then the compositum EF is an algebraic extension of K.
3. If E is an algebraic extension of F and E > K > F then E is an algebraic extension of K.

These finitary results can be generalized using transfinite induction:

4. The union of any chain of algebraic extensions over a base field is itself an algebraic extension over the same base field.

This fact, together with Zorn's lemma (applied to an appropriately chosen poset), establishes the existence of algebraic closures.

== Generalizations ==
Model theory generalizes the notion of algebraic extension to arbitrary theories: an embedding of M into N is called an algebraic extension if for every x in N there is a formula p with parameters in M, such that p(x) is true and the set

$$\left\{y\in N \mid p(y)\right\}$$

is finite. It turns out that applying this definition to the theory of fields gives the usual definition of algebraic extension. The Galois group of N over M can again be defined as the group of automorphisms, and it turns out that most of the theory of Galois groups can be developed for the general case.

== Relative algebraic closures ==
Given a field k and a field K containing k, one defines the relative algebraic closure of k in K to be the subfield of K consisting of all elements of K that are algebraic over k, that is all elements of K that are a root of some nonzero polynomial with coefficients in k.

== See also ==
- Integral element
- Lüroth's theorem
- Galois extension
- Separable extension
- Normal extension
