= Demushkin group =

In mathematical group theory, a Demushkin group (also written as Demuškin or Demuskin) is a pro-p group $G$ having a certain properties relating to duality in group cohomology. More precisely, $G$ must be such that the first cohomology group with coefficients in $\mathbb F_p = \mathbb Z/p\mathbb Z$ has finite rank, the second cohomology group has rank 1, and the cup product induces a non-degenerate pairing

$$H^1(G,\mathbb F_p)\times H^1(G,\mathbb F_p) \rightarrow H^2(G,\mathbb F_p).$$

Such groups were introduced by Demuškin (1959).

Demushkin groups occur as the Galois groups of the maximal $p$-extensions of local number fields containing all $p$-th roots of unity.
