= Algebraically closed field =

Algebraic structure where all polynomials have roots

In mathematics, a field F is algebraically closed if every non-constant polynomial with coefficients in F has a root in F. In other words, a field is algebraically closed if the fundamental theorem of algebra holds for it. For example, the field of real numbers is not algebraically closed because the polynomial $x^2 + 1$ has no real roots, while the field of complex numbers is algebraically closed.

Every field $K$ is contained in an algebraically closed field $C,$ and the roots in $C$ of the polynomials with coefficients in $K$ form an algebraically closed field called an algebraic closure of $K.$ Given two algebraic closures of $K$ there are isomorphisms between them that fix the elements of $K.$

Algebraically closed fields appear in the following chain of class inclusions:

rngs ⊃ rings ⊃ commutative rings ⊃ integral domains ⊃ integrally closed domains ⊃ GCD domains ⊃ unique factorization domains ⊃ principal ideal domains ⊃ Euclidean domains ⊃ fields ⊃ algebraically closed fields

== Examples ==
As a non-example, the field of real numbers is not algebraically closed, because the polynomial equation $x^2+1=0$ has no solution in real numbers, even though all its coefficients (1 and 0) are real. The same argument proves that no subfield of the real field is algebraically closed; in particular, the field of rational numbers is not algebraically closed. By contrast, the fundamental theorem of algebra states that the field of complex numbers is algebraically closed. Another example of an algebraically closed field is the field of (complex) algebraic numbers.

No finite field F is algebraically closed, because if a_{1}, a_{2}, ..., a_{n} are the elements of F, then the polynomial (x − a_{1})(x − a_{2}) ⋯ (x − a_{n}) + 1 has no zero in F. However, the union of all finite fields of a fixed characteristic p (p prime) is an algebraically closed field, which is, in fact, the algebraic closure of the field $\mathbb F_p$ with p elements.

The field $\mathbb{C}(x)$ of rational functions with complex coefficients is not closed; for example, the polynomial $y^2 - x$ has roots $\pm\sqrt{x}$, which are not elements of $\mathbb{C}(x)$.

== Equivalent properties ==
Given a field F, the assertion "F is algebraically closed" is equivalent to other assertions:

=== The only irreducible polynomials are those of degree one ===
The field F is algebraically closed if and only if the only irreducible polynomials in the polynomial ring F[x] are those of degree one.

The assertion "the polynomials of degree one are irreducible" is trivially true for any field. If F is algebraically closed and p(x) is an irreducible polynomial of F[x], then it has some root a and therefore p(x) is a multiple of x − a. Since p(x) is irreducible, this means that p(x) = k(x − a), for some k ∈ F \ {0} . On the other hand, if F is not algebraically closed, then there is some non-constant polynomial p(x) in F[x] without roots in F. Let q(x) be some irreducible factor of p(x). Since p(x) has no roots in F, q(x) also has no roots in F. Therefore, q(x) has degree greater than one, since every first degree polynomial has one root in F.

=== Every polynomial is a product of first degree polynomials ===
The field F is algebraically closed if and only if every polynomial p(x) of degree n ≥ 1, with coefficients in F, splits into linear factors. In other words, there are elements k, x_{1}, x_{2}, ..., x_{n} of the field F such that p(x) = k(x − x_{1})(x − x_{2}) ⋯ (x − x_{n}).

If F has this property, then clearly every non-constant polynomial in F[x] has some root in F; in other words, F is algebraically closed. On the other hand, that the property stated here holds for F if F is algebraically closed follows from the previous property together with the fact that, for any field K, any polynomial in K[x] can be written as a product of irreducible polynomials.

=== Polynomials of prime degree have roots ===
If every polynomial over F of prime degree has a root in F, then every non-constant polynomial has a root in F. It follows that a field is algebraically closed if and only if every polynomial over F of prime degree has a root in F.

=== The field has no proper algebraic extension ===
The field F is algebraically closed if and only if it has no proper algebraic extension.

If F has no proper algebraic extension, let p(x) be some irreducible polynomial in F[x]. Then the quotient of F[x] modulo the ideal generated by p(x) is an algebraic extension of F whose degree is equal to the degree of p(x). Since it is not a proper extension, its degree is 1 and therefore the degree of p(x) is 1.

On the other hand, if F has some proper algebraic extension K, then the minimal polynomial of an element in K \ F is irreducible and its degree is greater than 1.

=== The field has no proper finite extension ===
The field F is algebraically closed if and only if it has no proper finite extension because if, within the previous proof, the term "algebraic extension" is replaced by the term "finite extension", then the proof is still valid. (Finite extensions are necessarily algebraic.)

=== Every endomorphism of F^{n} has some eigenvector ===
The field F is algebraically closed if and only if, for each natural number n, every linear map from F^{n} into itself has some eigenvector.

An endomorphism of F^{n} has an eigenvector if and only if its characteristic polynomial has some root. Therefore, when F is algebraically closed, every endomorphism of F^{n} has some eigenvector. On the other hand, if every endomorphism of F^{n} has an eigenvector, let p(x) be an element of F[x]. Dividing by its leading coefficient, we get another polynomial q(x) which has roots if and only if p(x) has roots. But if q(x) = x^{n} + a_{n − 1} x^{n − 1} + ⋯ + a_{0}, then q(x) is the characteristic polynomial of the n×n companion matrix

$$\begin{pmatrix}
0 & 0 & \cdots & 0 & -a_0\\
1 & 0 & \cdots & 0 & -a_1\\
0 & 1 & \cdots & 0 & -a_2\\
\vdots & \vdots & \ddots & \vdots & \vdots\\
0 & 0 & \cdots & 1 & -a_{n-1}
\end{pmatrix}.$$

=== Decomposition of rational expressions ===
The field F is algebraically closed if and only if every rational function in one variable x, with coefficients in F, can be written as the sum of a polynomial function with rational functions of the form a/(x − b)^{n}, where n is a natural number, and a and b are elements of F.

If F is algebraically closed then, since the irreducible polynomials in F[x] are all of degree 1, the property stated above holds by the theorem on partial fraction decomposition.

On the other hand, suppose that the property stated above holds for the field F. Let p(x) be an irreducible element in F[x]. Then the rational function 1/p can be written as the sum of a polynomial function q with rational functions of the form a/(x – b)^{n}. Therefore, the rational expression

$$\frac1{p(x)}-q(x)=\frac{1-p(x)q(x)}{p(x)}$$

can be written as a quotient of two polynomials in which the denominator is a product of first degree polynomials. Since p(x) is irreducible, it must divide this product and, therefore, it must also be a first degree polynomial.

=== Relatively prime polynomials and roots ===
For any field F, if two polynomials p(x), q(x) ∈ F[x] are relatively prime then they do not have a common root, for if a ∈ F was a common root, then p(x) and q(x) would both be multiples of x − a and therefore they would not be relatively prime. The fields for which the reverse implication holds (that is, the fields such that whenever two polynomials have no common root then they are relatively prime) are precisely the algebraically closed fields.

If the field F is algebraically closed, let p(x) and q(x) be two polynomials which are not relatively prime and let r(x) be their greatest common divisor. Then, since r(x) is not constant, it will have some root a, which will be then a common root of p(x) and q(x).

If F is not algebraically closed, let p(x) be a polynomial whose degree is at least 1 without roots. Then p(x) and p(x) are not relatively prime, but they have no common roots (since none of them has roots).

== Other properties ==
If F is an algebraically closed field and n is a natural number, then F contains all nth roots of unity, because these are (by definition) the n (not necessarily distinct) zeroes of the polynomial x^{n} − 1. A field extension that is contained in an extension generated by the roots of unity is a cyclotomic extension, and the extension of a field generated by all roots of unity is sometimes called its cyclotomic closure. Thus algebraically closed fields are cyclotomically closed. The converse is not true. Even assuming that every polynomial of the form x^{n} − a splits into linear factors is not enough to assure that the field is algebraically closed.

If a proposition which can be expressed in the language of first-order logic is true for an algebraically closed field, then it is true for every algebraically closed field with the same characteristic. Furthermore, if such a proposition is valid for an algebraically closed field with characteristic 0, then not only is it valid for all other algebraically closed fields with characteristic 0, but there is some natural number N such that the proposition is valid for every algebraically closed field with characteristic p when p > N.

Every field F has some extension which is algebraically closed. Such an extension is called an algebraically closed extension. Among all such extensions there is one and only one (up to isomorphism, but not unique isomorphism) which is an algebraic extension of F; it is called the algebraic closure of F.

The theory of algebraically closed fields has quantifier elimination.

There is no algebraically closed finite field: if there were such a field, with underlying set $\{0, 1, k_2, ..., k_n\}$ for some $n\in\N$, then the polynomial $x(x-1)(x-k_2)...(x-k_n) +1$ would never vanish for any value of $x$.

== See also ==
- Pseudo algebraically closed field
- Quasi-algebraically closed field
- Quadratically closed field
- Real closed field
