= Algebraic closure =

Algebraic field extension

In mathematics, particularly abstract algebra, an algebraic closure of a field K is an algebraic extension of K that is algebraically closed. It is one of many closures in mathematics.

Zorn's lemma or the weaker ultrafilter lemma imply that every field has an algebraic closure, and that the algebraic closure of a field K is unique up to an isomorphism that fixes every member of K. Because of this essential uniqueness, one often speaks of the algebraic closure of K, rather than an algebraic closure of K.

The algebraic closure of a field K can be thought of as the largest algebraic extension of K. To see this, note that if L is any algebraic extension of K, then the algebraic closure of L is also an algebraic closure of K, and so L is contained within the algebraic closure of K. The algebraic closure of K is also the smallest algebraically closed field containing K, because if M is any algebraically closed field containing K, then the elements of M that are algebraic over K form an algebraic closure of K.

The algebraic closure of a field K has the same cardinality as K if K is infinite, and is countably infinite if K is finite.

== Examples ==
- By the fundamental theorem of algebra, the algebraic closure of the field $\mathbf R$ of real numbers is the field $\mathbf C$ of complex numbers.
- The algebraic closure of the field $\mathbf Q$ of rational numbers is the field $\overline{\mathbf Q}$ of algebraic numbers.
- There are many countable algebraically closed fields within the complex numbers, and strictly containing the field of algebraic numbers; these are the algebraic closures of transcendental extensions of the rational numbers, e.g. the algebraic closure of $\mathbf{Q} (\pi)$.
- For any prime number $p$, there is a countably infinite field $\overline{\mathbf F_p}$ (also denoted $\mathbf F_{p^\infty}$) which is the algebraic closure of the finite field $\mathbf F_{p^k}$ for every positive integer $k$. The field $\overline{\mathbf F_p}$ contains a copy of $\mathbf F_{p^n}$ for each positive integer $n$, and in fact, it is the union (more precisely, the direct limit) of the fields $\mathbf F_{p^n}$.
- By Puiseux's theorem, the algebraic closure of the field $\mathbf C((x))$ of formal Laurent series is the field of Puiseux series.

== Existence of an algebraic closure and splitting fields ==
Let $S = \{ f_{\lambda} \mid \lambda \in \Lambda\}$ be the set of all monic irreducible polynomials in $K[x]$. For each $f_{\lambda} \in S$, introduce new variables $u_{\lambda,1},\ldots,u_{\lambda,d}$ where $d = {\rm degree}(f_{\lambda})$. Let $R$ be the polynomial ring over $K$ generated by $u_{\lambda,i}$ for all $\lambda \in \Lambda$ and all $i \leq {\rm degree}(f_{\lambda}).$ Write

$$f_{\lambda} - \prod_{i=1}^d (x-u_{\lambda,i}) = \sum_{j=0}^{d-1} r_{\lambda,j} \cdot x^j \in R[x]$$

with $r_{\lambda,j} \in R$. Let $I$ be the ideal in $R$ generated by the $r_{\lambda,j}$. Since $I$ is strictly smaller than $R$, Zorn's lemma implies that there exists a maximal ideal $M$ in $R$ that contains $I$. The field $K_1=R/M$ has the property that every polynomial $f_{\lambda}$ with coefficients in $K$ splits as the product of $x-(u_{\lambda,i} + M),$ and hence has all roots in $K_1$. In the same way, an extension $K_2$ of $K_1$ can be constructed, etc. The union of all these extensions is the algebraic closure of $K$, because any polynomial with coefficients in this new field has its coefficients in some $K_n$ with sufficiently large $n$, and then its roots are in $K_{n+1}$, and hence in the union itself.

It can be shown along the same lines that for any subset $S$ of $K[x]$, there exists a splitting field of $S$ over $K$.

== Separable closure ==
An algebraic closure $K^{\text{alg}}$of $K$ contains a unique separable extension $K^{\text{sep}}$ of K containing all (algebraic) separable extensions of $K$ within $K^{\text{alg}}$. This subextension is called a separable closure of $K$. Since a separable extension of a separable extension is again separable, there are no finite separable extensions of $K^{\text{sep}}$, of degree > 1. Saying this another way, $K$ is contained in a separably-closed algebraic extension field. It is unique (up to isomorphism).

The separable closure is the full algebraic closure if and only if $K$ is a perfect field. For example, if $K$ is a field of characteristic $p$ and if $X$ is transcendental over $K$, $K(X)(\sqrt[p]{X}) \supset K(X)$ is a non-separable algebraic field extension.

In general, the absolute Galois group of $K$ is the Galois group of $K^{\text{sep}}$ over $K$.

== See also ==
- Puiseux expansion
- Complete field
