= Normal extension =

Type of algebraic field extension

In abstract algebra, a normal extension is an algebraic field extension L/K for which every irreducible polynomial over K that has a root in L splits into linear factors over L. This is one of the conditions for an algebraic extension to be a Galois extension. Bourbaki calls such an extension a quasi-Galois extension. For finite extensions, a normal extension is identical to a splitting field.

== Definition ==
Let $L/K$ be an algebraic extension (i.e., L is an algebraic extension of K), such that $L\subseteq \overline{K}$ (i.e., L is contained in an algebraic closure of K). Then the following conditions, any of which can be regarded as a definition of normal extension, are equivalent:

- Every embedding of L in $\overline{K}$ over K induces an automorphism of L.
- L is the splitting field of a family of polynomials in $K[X]$.
- Every irreducible polynomial of $K[X]$ that has a root in L splits into linear factors in L.

== Other properties ==
Let L be an extension of a field K. Then:

- If L is a normal extension of K and if E is an intermediate extension (that is, L ⊇ E ⊇ K), then L is a normal extension of E.
- If E and F are normal extensions of K contained in L, then the compositum EF and E ∩ F are also normal extensions of K.

== Equivalent conditions for normality ==
Let $L/K$ be algebraic. The field L is a normal extension if and only if any of the equivalent conditions below hold.

- The minimal polynomial over K of every element in L splits in L;
- There is a set $S \subseteq K[x]$ of polynomials that each splits over L, such that if $K\subseteq F\subsetneq L$ are fields, then S has a polynomial that does not split in F;
- All homomorphisms $L \to \bar{K}$ that fix all elements of K have the same image;
- The group of automorphisms, $\text{Aut}(L/K),$ of L that fix all elements of K, acts transitively on the set of homomorphisms $L \to \bar{K}$ that fix all elements of K.

== Examples and counterexamples ==
For example, $\Q(\sqrt{2})$ is a normal extension of $\Q,$ since it is a splitting field of $x^2-2.$ On the other hand, $\Q(\sqrt[3]{2})$ is not a normal extension of $\Q$ since the irreducible polynomial $x^3-2$ has one root in it (namely, $\sqrt[3]{2}$), but not all of them (it does not have the non-real cubic roots of 2). Recall that the field $\overline{\Q}$ of algebraic numbers is the algebraic closure of $\Q,$ and thus it contains $\Q(\sqrt[3]{2}).$ Let $\omega$ be a primitive cubic root of unity. Then since,
$$\Q (\sqrt[3]{2})=\left. \left \{a+b\sqrt[3]{2}+c\sqrt[3]{4}\in\overline{\Q }\,\,\right | \,\,a,b,c\in\Q \right \}$$
the map
$$\begin{cases} \sigma:\Q (\sqrt[3]{2})\longrightarrow\overline{\Q}\\ a+b\sqrt[3]{2}+c\sqrt[3]{4}\longmapsto a+b\omega\sqrt[3]{2}+c\omega^2\sqrt[3]{4}\end{cases}$$
is an embedding of $\Q(\sqrt[3]{2})$ in $\overline{\Q}$ whose restriction to $\Q$ is the identity. However, $\sigma$ is not an automorphism of $\Q (\sqrt[3]{2}).$

For any prime $p,$ the extension $\Q (\sqrt[p]{2}, \zeta_p)$ is normal of degree $p(p-1).$ It is a splitting field of $x^p - 2.$ Here $\zeta_p$ denotes any $p$th primitive root of unity. The field $\Q (\sqrt[3]{2}, \zeta_3)$ is the normal closure (see below) of $\Q (\sqrt[3]{2}).$

== Normal closure ==
If K is a field and L is an algebraic extension of K, then there is some algebraic extension M of L such that M is a normal extension of K. Furthermore, up to isomorphism there is only one such extension that is minimal, that is, the only subfield of M that contains L and that is a normal extension of K is M itself. This extension is called the normal closure of the extension L of K.

If L is a finite extension of K, then its normal closure is also a finite extension.

== See also ==
- Galois extension
- Normal basis
