= Splitting field =

Field generated by all rupture-fields of a polynomial over a field

In abstract algebra, a splitting field of a polynomial with coefficients in a field is the smallest field extension of that field over which the polynomial splits, i.e., decomposes into linear factors. For example, the polynomial $x^2 - 2$ does not factor over the rationals; its splitting field is the smallest extension of the rationals containing $\sqrt{2}$ and $-\sqrt{2}$.

== Definition ==
A splitting field of a polynomial p(X) over a field K is a field extension L of K over which p factors into linear factors

$$p(X) = c \prod_{i=1}^{\deg p} (X - a_i)$$

where $c \in K$ and for each $i$ we have $X - a_i \in L[X]$ with a_{i} not necessarily distinct and such that the roots a_{i} generate L over K. The extension L is then an extension of minimal degree over K in which p splits. It can be shown that such splitting fields exist and are unique up to isomorphism. The amount of freedom in that isomorphism is known as the Galois group of p (if we assume it is separable).

A splitting field of a set P of polynomials is the smallest field over which each of the polynomials in P splits.

== Properties ==
An extension L that is a splitting field for a set of polynomials p(X) over K is called a normal extension of K.

Given an algebraically closed field A containing K, there is a unique splitting field L of p between K and A, generated by the roots of p. If K is a subfield of the complex numbers, the existence is immediate. On the other hand, the existence of algebraic closures in general is often proved by 'passing to the limit' from the splitting field result, which therefore requires an independent proof to avoid circular reasoning.

Given a separable extension K′ of K, a Galois closure L of K′ is a type of splitting field, and also a Galois extension of K containing K′ that is minimal, in an obvious sense. Such a Galois closure should contain a splitting field for all the polynomials p over K that are minimal polynomials over K of elements of K′.

== Constructing splitting fields ==
=== The construction ===
Let F be a field and p(X) be a polynomial in the polynomial ring F[X] of degree n. The general process for constructing K, the splitting field of p(X) over F, is to construct a chain of fields $F=K_0 \subseteq K_1 \subseteq \cdots \subseteq K_{r-1} \subseteq K_r=K$ such that K_{i} is an extension of K_{i−1} containing a new root of p(X). Since p(X) has at most n roots the construction will require at most n extensions. The steps for constructing K_{i} are given as follows:

- Factorize p(X) over K_{i} into irreducible factors $f_1(X)f_2(X) \cdots f_k(X)$.
- Choose any nonlinear irreducible factor f(X).
- Construct the field extension K_{i+1} of K_{i} as the quotient ring K_{i+1} = K_{i}[X] / (f(X)) where (f(X)) denotes the ideal in K_{i}[X] generated by f(X).
- Repeat the process for K_{i+1} until p(X) completely factors.

The irreducible factor f(X) used in the quotient construction may be chosen arbitrarily. Although different choices of factors may lead to different subfield sequences, the resulting splitting fields will be isomorphic.

Since f(X) is irreducible, (f(X)) is a maximal ideal of K_{i}[X] and K_{i}[X] / (f(X)) is, in fact, a field, the residue field for that maximal ideal. Moreover, if we let $\pi : K_i[X] \to K_i[X]/(f(X))$ be the natural projection of the ring onto its quotient then

$$f(\pi(X)) = \pi(f(X)) = f(X)\ \bmod\ f(X) = 0$$

so π(X) is a root of f(X) and of p(X).

The degree of a single extension $[K_{i+1} : K_i]$ is equal to the degree of the irreducible factor f(X). The degree of the extension [K : F] is given by $[K_r : K_{r-1}] \cdots [K_2 : K_1] [K_1 : F]$ and is at most n!.

=== The field K_{i}[X]/(f(X)) ===
As mentioned above, the quotient ring K_{i+1} = K_{i}[X]/(f(X)) is a field when f(X) is irreducible. Its elements are of the form

$$c_{n-1}\alpha^{n-1} + c_{n-2}\alpha^{n-2} + \cdots + c_1\alpha + c_0$$

where the c_{j} are in K_{i} and α = π(X). (If one considers K_{i+1} as a vector space over K_{i} then the powers α^{j} for 0 ≤ j ≤ n−1 form a basis.)

The elements of K_{i+1} can be considered as polynomials in α of degree less than n. Addition in K_{i+1} is given by the rules for polynomial addition, and multiplication is given by polynomial multiplication modulo f(X). That is, for g(α) and h(α) in K_{i+1} their product is g(α)h(α) = r(α) where r(X) is the remainder of g(X)h(X) when divided by f(X) in K_{i}[X].

The remainder r(X) can be computed through polynomial long division; however there is also a straightforward reduction rule that can be used to compute r(α) = g(α)h(α) directly. First let

$$f(X) = X^n + b_{n-1} X^{n-1} + \cdots + b_1 X + b_0.$$

The polynomial is over a field so one can take f(X) to be monic without loss of generality. Now α is a root of f(X), so

$$\alpha^n = -(b_{n-1} \alpha^{n-1} + \cdots + b_1 \alpha + b_0).$$

If the product g(α)h(α) has a term α^{m} with m ≥ n it can be reduced as follows:

$$\alpha^n\alpha^{m-n} = -(b_{n-1} \alpha^{n-1} + \cdots + b_1 \alpha + b_0) \alpha^{m-n} = -(b_{n-1} \alpha^{m-1} + \cdots + b_1 \alpha^{m-n+1} + b_0 \alpha^{m-n})$$.

As an example of the reduction rule, take K_{i} = Q[X], the ring of polynomials with rational coefficients, and take f(X) = X^{7} − 2. Let $g(\alpha) = \alpha^5 + \alpha^2$ and h(α) = α^{3} +1 be two elements of Q[X]/(X^{7} − 2). The reduction rule given by f(X) is α^{7} = 2 so

$$g(\alpha)h(\alpha) = (\alpha^5 + \alpha^2)(\alpha^3 + 1) = \alpha^8 + 2 \alpha^5 + \alpha^2 = (\alpha^7)\alpha + 2\alpha^5 + \alpha^2 = 2 \alpha^5 + \alpha^2 + 2\alpha.$$

== Examples ==
=== The complex numbers ===
Consider the polynomial ring R[x], and the irreducible polynomial x^{2} + 1. The quotient ring R[x] / (x^{2} + 1) is given by the congruence x^{2} ≡ −1. As a result, the elements (or equivalence classes) of R[x] / (x^{2} + 1) are of the form a + bx where a and b belong to R. To see this, note that since x^{2} ≡ −1 it follows that x^{3} ≡ −x, x^{4} ≡ 1, x^{5} ≡ x, etc.; and so, for example p + qx + rx^{2} + sx^{3} ≡ p + qx + r(−1) + s(−x) = (p − r) + (q − s)x.

The addition and multiplication operations are given by firstly using ordinary polynomial addition and multiplication, but then reducing modulo x^{2} + 1, i.e. using the fact that x^{2} ≡ −1, x^{3} ≡ −x, x^{4} ≡ 1, x^{5} ≡ x, etc. Thus:

$$(a_1 + b_1x) + (a_2 + b_2x) = (a_1 + a_2) + (b_1 + b_2)x,$$
$$(a_1 + b_1x)(a_2 + b_2x) = a_1a_2 + (a_1b_2 + b_1a_2)x + (b_1b_2)x^2 \equiv (a_1a_2 - b_1b_2) + (a_1b_2 + b_1a_2)x \, .$$

If we identify a + bx with (a, b) then we see that addition and multiplication are given by

$$(a_1,b_1) + (a_2,b_2) = (a_1 + a_2,b_1 + b_2),$$
$$(a_1,b_1)\cdot (a_2,b_2) = (a_1a_2 - b_1b_2,a_1b_2 + b_1a_2).$$

We claim that, as a field, the quotient ring R[x] / (x^{2} + 1) is isomorphic to the complex numbers, C. A general complex number is of the form a + bi, where a and b are real numbers and i^{2} = −1. Addition and multiplication are given by

$$(a_1 + b_1 i) + (a_2 + b_2 i) = (a_1 + a_2) + i(b_1 + b_2),$$
$$(a_1 + b_1 i) \cdot (a_2 + b_2 i) = (a_1a_2 - b_1b_2) + i(a_1b_2 + a_2b_1).$$

If we identify a + bi with (a, b) then we see that addition and multiplication are given by

$$(a_1,b_1) + (a_2,b_2) = (a_1 + a_2,b_1 + b_2),$$
$$(a_1,b_1)\cdot (a_2,b_2) = (a_1a_2 - b_1b_2,a_1b_2 + b_1a_2).$$

The previous calculations show that addition and multiplication behave the same way in R[x] / (x^{2} + 1) and C. In fact, we see that the map between R[x] / (x^{2} + 1) and C given by a + bx → a + bi is a homomorphism with respect to addition and multiplication. It is also obvious that the map a + bx → a + bi is both injective and surjective; meaning that a + bx → a + bi is a bijective homomorphism, i.e., an isomorphism. It follows that, as claimed: R[x] / (x^{2} + 1) ≅ C.

In 1847, Cauchy used this approach to define the complex numbers.

=== Cubic example ===
Let K be the rational number field Q and p(x) = x^{3} − 2. Each root of p equals $\sqrt[3]{2}$ times a cube root of unity. Therefore, if we denote the cube roots of unity by

$\omega_1 = 1,\,$
$$\omega_2 = -\frac{1}{2} + \frac{\sqrt{3}}{2} i,$$
$$\omega_3 = -\frac{1}{2} - \frac{\sqrt{3}}{2} i.$$

any field containing two distinct roots of p will contain the quotient between two distinct cube roots of unity. Such a quotient is a primitive cube root of unity—either $\omega_2$ or $\omega_3=1/\omega_2$. It follows that a splitting field L of p will contain ω_{2}, as well as the real cube root of 2; conversely, any extension of Q containing these elements contains all the roots of p. Thus

$$L = \mathbf{Q}(\sqrt[3]{2}, \omega_2) = \{ a + b\sqrt[3]{2} + c{\sqrt[3]{2}}^2 + d\omega_2 + e\sqrt[3]{2}\omega_2 + f{\sqrt[3]{2}}^2 \omega_2 \mid a,b,c,d,e,f \in \mathbf{Q} \}$$

Note that applying the construction process outlined in the previous section to this example, one begins with $K_0 = \mathbf{Q}$ and constructs the field $K_1 = \mathbf{Q}[X] / (X^3 - 2)$. This field is not the splitting field, but contains one (any) root. However, the polynomial $Y^3 - 2$ is not irreducible over $K_1$ and in fact:

$$Y^3 -2 = (Y - X)(Y^2 + XY + X^2).$$

Note that $X$ is not an indeterminate, and is in fact an element of $K_1$. Now, continuing the process, we obtain $K_2 = K_1[Y] / (Y^2 + XY + X^2)$, which is indeed the splitting field and is spanned by the $\mathbf{Q}$-basis $\{1, X, X^2, Y, XY, X^2 Y\}$. Notice that if we compare this with $L$ from above we can identify $X = \sqrt[3]{2}$ and $Y = \omega_2 \sqrt[3]{2}$.

=== Other examples ===
- The splitting field of x^{q} − x over F_{p} is the unique finite field F_{q} for q = p^{n}. Sometimes this field is denoted by GF(q).
- The splitting field of x^{2} + 1 over F_{7} is F_{49}; the polynomial has no roots in F_{7}, i.e., −1 is not a square there, because 7 is not congruent to 1 modulo 4.
- The splitting field of x^{2} − 1 over F_{7} is F_{7} since x^{2} − 1 = (x + 1)(x − 1) already splits into linear factors.
- We calculate the splitting field of f(x) = x^{3} + x + 1 over F_{2}. It is easy to verify that f(x) has no roots in F_{2}; hence f(x) is irreducible in F_{2}[x]. Put r = x + (f(x)) in F_{2}[x]/(f(x)) so F_{2}(r) is a field and x^{3} + x + 1 = (x + r)(x^{2} + ax + b) in F_{2}(r)[x]. Note that we can write + for − since the characteristic is two. Comparing coefficients shows that a = r and b = 1 + r^{2}. The elements of F_{2}(r) can be listed as c + dr + er^{2}, where c, d, e are in F_{2}. There are eight elements: 0, 1, r, 1 + r, r^{2}, 1 + r^{2}, r + r^{2} and 1 + r + r^{2}. Substituting these in x^{2} + rx + 1 + r^{2} we reach (r^{2})^{2} + r(r^{2}) + 1 + r^{2} = r^{4} + r^{3} + 1 + r^{2} = 0, therefore x^{3} + x + 1 = (x + r)(x + r^{2})(x + (r + r^{2})) for r in F_{2}[x]/(f(x)); E = F_{2}(r) is a splitting field of x^{3} + x + 1 over F_{2}.
