= List of American mathematicians =

This is a list of American mathematicians.

== List ==
- James Waddell Alexander II (1888–1971)
- Stephanie B. Alexander, elected in 2014 as a fellow of the American Mathematical Society "for contributions to geometry, for high-quality exposition, and for exceptional teaching of mathematics"
- Linda J. S. Allen
- Ann S. Almgren, applied mathematician who works as a senior scientist and group leader of the Center for Computational Sciences and Engineering at the Lawrence Berkeley National Laboratory
- Frederick Almgren (1933–1997)
- Beverly Anderson (b. 1943)
- Natascha Artin Brunswick (1909–2003)
- Tamara Awerbuch-Friedlander (1941–2021)
- Wealthy Babcock (1895–1990)
- Benjamin Banneker (1731–1806)
- Augustin Banyaga (b. 1947)
- Ruth Aaronson Bari (1917–2005)
- Janet Barnett
- Jon Barwise (1942–2000)
- Richard Bellman (1920–1984)
- Leonid Berlyand (b. 1957)
- Leah Berman (b. 1976)
- Manjul Bhargava (b. 1974)
- George David Birkhoff (1884–1944)
- David Blackwell (1919–2010)
- Archie Blake (1906–1971)
- Nathaniel Bowditch (1773–1838)
- Andrew Browder (1931–2019)
- Felix Browder (1927–2016)
- William Browder (1934–2025), pioneered the surgery theory method for classifying high-dimensional manifolds.
- Marjorie Lee Browne (1914–1979), taught at North Carolina Central University
- Robert Daniel Carmichael (1879–1967)
- Sun-Yung Alice Chang (b. 1948), researcher in mathematical analysis
- Alonzo Church (1903–1995)
- William Schieffelin Claytor (1908–1967), third African-American to earn a Ph.D. in mathematics, University of Pennsylvania
- Paul Cohen (1934–2007)
- Don Coppersmith (b. 1950), cryptographer, first four-time Putnam Fellow in history
- Elbert Frank Cox (1895–1969), first African-American to earn a Ph.D. in mathematics, Cornell University
- Laura Demarco (b. 1974), researcher in dynamical systems and complex analysis
- Joseph J. Dennis (1905–1977), Clark College
- Joseph L. Doob (1910–2004)
- Jesse Douglas (1897–1965)
- Samuel Eilenberg (1913–1998)
- Noam Elkies (b. 1966), mathematical prodigy who works in computational number theory
- Jerald Ericksen (1924–2021)
- Alex Eskin (b. 1965), researcher in rational billiards and geometric group theory
- Christina Eubanks-Turner, American mathematics educator, graph theorist, and commutative algebraist
- Lawrence C. Evans (b. 1949)
- Etta Zuber Falconer (1933–2002)
- Benson Farb (b. 1965), researcher in geometric group theory and low-dimensional topology
- Lisa Fauci, applied mathematician who applies computational fluid dynamics to biological processes
- Charles Fefferman (b. 1949)
- Henry Burchard Fine (1858–1928)
- Erica Flapan (b. 1956), researcher in low-dimensional topology and knot theory
- Alfred Leon Foster (1904–1994)
- Ralph Fox (1913–1973)
- Michael Freedman (b. 1951)
- Edgar Fuller
- Murray Gerstenhaber (1927–2024)
- Andrew M. Gleason (1921–2008), WWII codebreaker, major contributor in solving Hilbert's 5th Problem ("restricted" version).
- Thomas Godfrey (1704–1749)
- Ralph E. Gomory (b. 1929)
- Daniel Gorenstein (1923–1992)
- Ronald Graham (1935–2020)
- Evelyn Boyd Granville (1924–2023)
- Phillip Griffiths (b. 1938), major contributor to complex manifold approach to algebraic geometry
- Benedict Gross (1950–2025)
- Frank Harary (1921–2005)
- Joe Harris (mathematician) (b. 1951), prolific researcher and expositor of algebraic geometry
- Euphemia Haynes (1890–1980), first African-American woman to earn a Ph.D. in mathematics
- Gloria Conyers Hewitt (b. 1935)
- George William Hill (1838–1914)
- Einar Hille (1894–1980)
- Arthur Hobbs (1940–2020)
- Alston Scott Householder (1904–1993)
- Nathan Jacobson (1910–1999)
- Katherine Johnson (1918–2020)
- Theodore Kaczynski (1942–2023)
- Howard Jerome Keisler (b. 1936)
- Victor Klee (1925–2007)
- Holly Krieger
- Harold W. Kuhn (1925–2014)
- Kenneth Kunen (1943–2020)
- Solomon Lefschetz (1884–1972)
- Suzanne Lenhart (b. 1954) researcher in partial differential equations; president of the Association for Women in Mathematics, 2001–2003
- James Lepowsky (b. 1944)
- Richard Levins (1930–2016), biomathematician, mathematical ecologist
- Marie Litzinger (1899–1952), number theorist
- Jacob Lurie (b. 1977), developed derived algebraic geometry
- Saunders Mac Lane (1909–2005)
- George Mackey (1916-2006)
- W. T. Martin (1911–2004)
- William S. Massey (1920–2017)
- John N. Mather (1942–2017)
- J. Peter May (b. 1939), researcher in algebraic topology, category theory, homotopy theory, and the foundational aspects of spectra
- Margaret Evelyn Mauch (1897–1987)
- Barry Mazur (b. 1937)
- Curtis T. McMullen (b. 1958)
- Elliott Mendelson (1931–2020)
- Winifred Edgerton Merrill (1862–1951)
- Kelly Miller (1863–1939)
- Kenneth Millett (b. 1941)
- John Milnor (b. 1931)
- Susan Montgomery (b. 1943)
- E. H. Moore (1862–1932)
- Marston Morse (1892–1977)
- Charles B. Morrey Jr. (1907-1984)
- George Mostow (1923–2017)
- Frederick Mosteller (1916–2006)
- David Mumford (b. 1937)
- John Forbes Nash Jr. (1928–2015)
- Edward Nelson (1932–2014)
- Walter Noll (1925–2017)
- Michael O'Nan (1943–2017)
- Richard Palais (b. 1931)
- Benjamin Peirce (1809–1880)
- Leona May Peirce (1863–1954)
- Javier Perez-Capdevila (b. 1963)
- Vera Pless (1931–2020), mathematician specialized in combinatorics and coding theory
- Jon T. Pitts (1948–2024)
- Daniel Quillen (1940–2011)
- Charles Reason (1818–1893)
- Jeffrey B. Remmel (1948–2017)
- Joseph Ritt (1893–1951)
- Fred S. Roberts (b. 1943)
- Herbert Robbins (1915–2001)
- Julia Robinson (1919–1985), contributor to Hilbert's tenth problem
- J. Barkley Rosser (1907–1989)
- Gerald Sacks (1933–2019)
- Grant Sanderson (b. 1997) 3Blue1Brown YouTube channel
- John Sarli (living), mathematician and academic
- Thomas Jerome Schaefer
- Dana Scott (b. 1932)
- James Serrin (1926–2012)
- Claude Shannon (1916–2001)
- Isadore Singer (1924–2021)
- Charles Coffin Sims (1938–2017)
- George Seligman (1927–2024)
- Stephen Smale (b. 1930)
- Raymond Smullyan (1919–2017)
- Edwin Spanier (1921–1996)
- Norman Steenrod (1910–1971)
- Elias M. Stein (1931–2018)
- Clarence F. Stephens (1917–2018)
- Lee Stiff (1949–2021)
- Marshall Harvey Stone (1903–1989)
- Theodore Strong (1790–1869)
- Terence Tao (b. 1975)
- John Tate (1925–2019)
- Jean Taylor (b. 1944)
- John G. Thompson (b. 1932)
- Sister Mary Domitilla Thuener (1880–1977)
- William Thurston (1936–2012)
- Clifford Truesdell (1919–2000)
- John Tukey (1915–2000)
- Bird Margaret Turner (1877–1962)
- John Urschel (b. 1991)
- Dorothy Vaughan (1910–2008)
- Oswald Veblen (1880–1960)
- Mary Shore Walker (1882–1952)
- William C. Waterhouse (1941–2016)
- Herbert Wilf (1931–2012)
- J. Ernest Wilkins, Jr. (1923–2011)
- Amie Wilkinson (b. 1968), researcher in dynamical systems, ergodic theory, chaos theory and semisimple Lie groups
- Hassler Whitney (1907–1989)
- Dudley Weldon Woodard (1881–1965), second African-American to earn a Ph.D. in mathematics, University of Pennsylvania
- Margaret H. Wright (b. 1944), first woman president of Society for Industrial and Applied Mathematics
