= AWM-SIAM Sonia Kovalevsky Lecture =

The AWM-SIAM Sonia Kovalevsky Lecture is an award and lecture series that "highlights significant contributions of women to applied or computational mathematics." The Association for Women in Mathematics (AWM) and the Society for Industrial and Applied Mathematics (SIAM) planned the award and lecture series in 2002 and first awarded it in 2003. The lecture is normally given each year at the SIAM Annual Meeting. Award winners receive a signed certificate from the AWM and SIAM presidents.

The lectures are named after Sonia Kovalevsky (1850–1891), a well-known Russian mathematician of the late 19th century. Karl Weierstrass regarded Kovalevsky as his most talented student. In 1874, she received her Doctor of Philosophy degree from the University of Göttingen under the supervision of Weierstrass. She was granted privatdozentin status and taught at the Stockholm University in 1883; she became an ordinary professor (the equivalent of full professor) at this institution in 1889. She was also an editor of the journal Acta Mathematica. Kovalevsky did her important work in the theory of partial differential equations and the rotation of a solid around a fixed point.

== Recipients ==
The Kovalevky Lecturers have been:

- 2003 Linda R. Petzold, University of California, Santa Barbara, “Towards the Multiscale Simulation of Biochemical Networks”
- 2004 Joyce R. McLaughlin, Rensselaer Polytechnic Institute, “Interior Elastodynamics Inverse Problems: Creating Shear Wave Speed Images of Tissue”
- 2005 Ingrid Daubechies, Princeton University, “Superfast and (Super)sparse Algorithms”
- 2006 Irene Fonseca, Carnegie Mellon University, “New Challenges in the Calculus of Variations”
- 2007 Lai-Sang Young, Courant Institute, “Shear-Induced Chaos”
- 2008 Dianne P. O'Leary, University of Maryland, “A Noisy Adiabatic Theorem: Wilkinson Meets Schrödinger’s Cat”
- 2009 Andrea Bertozzi, University of California, Los Angeles
- 2010 Suzanne Lenhart, University of Tennessee at Knoxville, “Mixing it up: Discrete and Continuous Optimal Control for Biological Models”
- 2011 Susanne C. Brenner, Louisiana State University, “A Cautionary Tale in Numerical PDEs”
- 2012 Barbara Keyfitz, Ohio State University, “The Role of Characteristics in Conservation Laws”
- 2013 Margaret Cheney, Colorado State University, “Introduction to Radar Imaging”
- 2014 Irene M. Gamba, University of Texas at Austin, “The evolution of complex interactions in non-linear kinetic systems”
- 2015 Linda J. S. Allen, Texas Tech University, “Predicting Population Extinction”
- 2016 Lisa J. Fauci, Tulane University, “Biofluids of Reproduction: Oscillators, Viscoelastic Networks and Sticky Situations”
- 2017 Liliana Borcea, University of Michigan, “Mitigating Uncertainty in Inverse Wave Scattering”
- 2018 Eva Tardos, Cornell University, “Learning and Efficiency of Outcomes in Games”
- 2019 Catherine Sulem, University of Toronto, “The Dynamics of Ocean Waves”
- 2020 Bonnie Berger, MIT, “Compressive genomics: leveraging the geometry of biological data”
- 2021 Vivette Girault, Université Pierre et Marie Curie, "From linear poroelasticity to nonlinear implicit elastic and related models"
- 2022 Anne Greenbaum, University of Washington, "Two of my Favorite Problems”
- 2023 Annalisa Buffa, Ecole Polytechnique Fédérale de Lausanne (EPFL), "Simulation of PDEs on Geometries Obtained via Boolean Operations"
- 2024 Sunčica Čanić, University of California at Berkeley, "Mathematics for Bioartificial Organ Design"
- 2025 Yongjie Jessica Zhang, Carnegie Mellon University, TBD
- 2026 Fioralba Cakoni, Rutgers University, TBD

== See also ==
- Falconer Lecture
- Noether Lecture
- List of mathematics awards
