= Benjamin Bernstein =

Benjamin Bernstein may refer to:

- Ben Blue (Benjamin Bernstein, 1901–1975), Canadian-American actor and comedian
- Benjamin Abram Bernstein (1881–1964), American mathematician
