= Facci =

Facci is an Italian surname. Notable people with the surname include:

- Loris Facci (born 1983), Italian swimmer
- Mauro Facci (born 1982), Italian cyclist
- Mayr Facci (1927–2015), Brazilian basketball player

== See also ==
- Fauci (surname)
