= Restricted Lie algebra =

In mathematics, a restricted Lie algebra (or p-Lie algebra) is a Lie algebra over a field of characteristic p>0 together with an additional "pth power" operation. Most naturally-occurring Lie algebras in characteristic p come with this structure, because the Lie algebra of a group scheme over a field of characteristic p is restricted.

== Definition ==
Let $\mathfrak{g}$ be a Lie algebra over a field k of characteristic p>0. The adjoint representation of $\mathfrak{g}$ is defined by $(\text{ad }X)(Y)=[X,Y]$ for $X,Y\in \mathfrak{g}$. A p-mapping on $\mathfrak{g}$ is a function from $\mathfrak{g}$ to itself, $X \mapsto X^{[p]}$, satisfying:

- $\mathrm{ad}(X^{[p]}) = (\mathrm{ad}\; X)^p$ for all $X \in \mathfrak{g}$,
- $(tX)^{[p]} = t^pX^{[p]}$ for all $t \in k$ and $X \in \mathfrak{g}$,
- $(X+Y)^{[p]} = X^{[p]} + Y^{[p]} + \sum_{i=1}^{p-1} s_i(X,Y)$ for all $X,Y \in \mathfrak{g}$, where $s_i(X,Y)$ is $1/i$ times the coefficient of $t^{i-1}$ in the formal expression $(\mathrm{ad}\; (tX+Y))^{p-1}(X)$.

Nathan Jacobson (1937) defined a restricted Lie algebra over k to be a Lie algebra over k together with a p-mapping. A Lie algebra is said to be restrictable if it has at least one p-mapping. By the first property above, in a restricted Lie algebra, the derivation $(\mathrm{ad}\; X)^p$ of $\mathfrak{g}$ is inner for each $X\in \mathfrak{g}$. In fact, a Lie algebra is restrictable if and only if the derivation $(\mathrm{ad}\; X)^p$ of $\mathfrak{g}$ is inner for each $X\in \mathfrak{g}$.

For example:

- For p = 2, a restricted Lie algebra has $(X+Y)^{[2]}=X^{[2]}+[Y,X]+Y^{[2]}$.
- For p = 3, a restricted Lie algebra has $(X+Y)^{[3]}=X^{[3]}+2[X,[Y,X]]+[Y,[Y,X]]+Y^{[3]}$.

== Examples ==
For an associative algebra A over a field k of characteristic p>0, the commutator $[X,Y] := XY-YX$ and the p-mapping $X^{[p]} := X^p$ make A into a restricted Lie algebra. In particular, taking A to be the ring of n x n matrices shows that the Lie algebra $\mathfrak{gl}(n)$ of n x n matrices over k is a restricted Lie algebra, with the p-mapping being the pth power of a matrix. This "explains" the definition of a restricted Lie algebra: the complicated formula for $(X+Y)^{[p]}$ is needed to express the pth power of the sum of two matrices over k, $(X+Y)^p$, given that X and Y typically do not commute.

Let A be an algebra over a field k. (Here A is a possibly non-associative algebra.) Then the derivations of A over k form a Lie algebra $\text{Der}_k(A)$, with the Lie bracket being the commutator, $[D_1,D_2]:=D_1D_2-D_2D_1$. When k has characteristic p>0, then iterating a derivation p times yields a derivation, and this makes $\text{Der}_k(A)$ into a restricted Lie algebra. If A has finite dimension as a vector space, then $\text{Der}_k(A)$ is the Lie algebra of the automorphism group scheme of A over k; that indicates why spaces of derivations are a natural way to construct Lie algebras.

Let G be a group scheme over a field k of characteristic p>0, and let $\mathrm{Lie}(G)$ be the Zariski tangent space at the identity element of G. Then $\mathrm{Lie}(G)$ is a restricted Lie algebra over k. This is essentially a special case of the previous example. Indeed, each element X of $\mathrm{Lie}(G)$ determines a left-invariant vector field on G, and hence a left-invariant derivation on the ring of regular functions on G. The pth power of this derivation is again a left-invariant derivation, hence the derivation associated to an element $X^{[p]}$ of $\mathrm{Lie}(G)$. Conversely, every restricted Lie algebra of finite dimension over k is the Lie algebra of a group scheme. In fact, $G\mapsto\mathrm{Lie}(G)$ is an equivalence of categories from finite group schemes G of height at most 1 over k (meaning that $f^p=0$ for all regular functions f on G that vanish at the identity element) to restricted Lie algebras of finite dimension over k.

In a sense, this means that Lie theory is less powerful in positive characteristic than in characteristic zero. In characteristic p>0, the multiplicative group $G_m$ (of dimension 1) and its finite subgroup scheme $\mu_p=\{ x\in G_m:x^p=1\}$ have the same restricted Lie algebra, namely the vector space k with the p-mapping $a^{[p]}=a^p$. More generally, the restricted Lie algebra of a group scheme G over k only depends on the kernel of the Frobenius homomorphism on G, which is a subgroup scheme of height at most 1. For another example, the Lie algebra of the additive group $G_a$ is the vector space k with p-mapping equal to zero. The corresponding Frobenius kernel is the subgroup scheme $\alpha_p=\{x\in G_a:x^p=0\}.$

For a scheme X over a field k of characteristic p>0, the space $H^0(X,TX)$ of vector fields on X is a restricted Lie algebra over k. (If X is affine, so that $X=\text{Spec}(A)$ for a commutative k-algebra A, this is the Lie algebra of derivations of A over k. In general, one can informally think of $H^0(X,TX)$ as the Lie algebra of the automorphism group of X over k.) An action of a group scheme G on X determines a homomorphism $\text{Lie}(G)\to H^0(X,TX)$ of restricted Lie algebras.

== The choice of a p-mapping ==
Given two p-mappings on a Lie algebra $\mathfrak{g}$, their difference is a p-linear function from $\mathfrak{g}$ to the center $\mathfrak{z}(\mathfrak{g})$. (p-linearity means that $f(X+Y)=f(X)+f(Y)$ and $f(tX)=t^pf(X)$.) Thus, if the center of $\mathfrak{g}$ is zero, then $\mathfrak{g}$ is a restricted Lie algebra in at most one way. In particular, this comment applies to any simple Lie algebra of characteristic p>0.

== The restricted enveloping algebra ==
The functor that takes an associative algebra A over k to A as a restricted Lie algebra has a left adjoint $\mathfrak{g}\mapsto u(\mathfrak{g})$, called the restricted enveloping algebra. To construct this, let $U(\mathfrak{g})$ be the universal enveloping algebra of $\mathfrak{g}$ over k (ignoring the p-mapping of $\mathfrak{g}$). Let I be the two-sided ideal generated by the elements $X^p - X^{[p]}$ for $X\in\mathfrak{g}$; then the restricted enveloping algebra is the quotient ring $u(\mathfrak{g}) = U(\mathfrak{g}) / I$. It satisfies a form of the Poincaré–Birkhoff–Witt theorem: if $e_1,\ldots,e_n$ is a basis for $\mathfrak{g}$ as a k-vector space, then a basis for $u(\mathfrak{g})$ is given by all ordered products $e_1^{i_1}\cdots e_n^{i_n}$ with $0\leq i_j\leq p-1$ for each j. In particular, the map $\mathfrak{g}\to u(\mathfrak{g})$ is injective, and if $\mathfrak{g}$ has dimension n as a vector space, then $u(\mathfrak{g})$ has dimension $p^n$ as a vector space.

A restricted representation V of a restricted Lie algebra $\mathfrak{g}$ is a representation of $\mathfrak{g}$ as a Lie algebra such that $X^{[p]}(v)=X^p(v)$ for all $X\in \mathfrak{g}$ and $v\in V$. Restricted representations of $\mathfrak{g}$ are equivalent to modules over the restricted enveloping algebra.

== Classification of simple Lie algebras ==
The simple Lie algebras of finite dimension over an algebraically closed field of characteristic zero were classified by Wilhelm Killing and Élie Cartan in the 1880s and 1890s, using root systems. Namely, every simple Lie algebra is of type A_{n}, B_{n}, C_{n}, D_{n}, E_{6}, E_{7}, E_{8}, F_{4}, or G_{2}. (For example, the simple Lie algebra of type A_{n} is the Lie algebra $\mathfrak{sl}(n+1)$ of (n+1) x (n+1) matrices of trace zero.)

In characteristic p>0, the classification of simple algebraic groups is the same as in characteristic zero. Their Lie algebras are simple in most cases, and so there are simple Lie algebras A_{n}, B_{n}, C_{n}, D_{n}, E_{6}, E_{7}, E_{8}, F_{4}, G_{2}, called (in this context) the classical simple Lie algebras. (Because they come from algebraic groups, the classical simple Lie algebras are restricted.) Surprisingly, there are also many other finite-dimensional simple Lie algebras in characteristic p>0. In particular, there are the simple Lie algebras of Cartan type, which are finite-dimensional analogs of infinite-dimensional Lie algebras in characteristic zero studied by Cartan. Namely, Cartan studied the Lie algebra of vector fields on a smooth manifold of dimension n, or the subalgebra of vector fields that preserve a volume form, a symplectic form, or a contact structure. In characteristic p>0, the simple Lie algebras of Cartan type include both restrictable and non-restrictable examples.

Richard Earl Block and Robert Lee Wilson (1988) classified the restricted simple Lie algebras over an algebraically closed field of characteristic p>7. Namely, they are all of classical or Cartan type. Alexander Premet and Helmut Strade (2004) extended the classification to Lie algebras which need not be restricted, and to a larger range of characteristics. (In characteristic 5, Hayk Melikyan found another family of simple Lie algebras.) Namely, every simple Lie algebra over an algebraically closed field of characteristic p>3 is of classical, Cartan, or Melikyan type.

== Jacobson's Galois correspondence ==
Jacobson's Galois correspondence for purely inseparable field extensions is expressed in terms of restricted Lie algebras.
