= Fioralba =

Fioralba is a feminine given name. Notable people with the name include:

- Fioralba Cakoni, American-Albanian mathematician
- Fioralba Disdari, 2013 Miss Universe Albania
- Fioralba, a character in the 1642 opera Il palazzo incantato
