= Čanić =

Čanić is a South Slavic surname found in Croatia and Serbia.

In Croatia, there are about 280 people surnamed Čanić in total.

Notable people with this surname include:

- Matija Čanić (1901–1964), Croatian military officer
- Sunčica Čanić, Croatian-American mathematician

== See also ==
- Canić
