= Edward William Barankin =

American mathematician and statistician

Edward W. Barankin
- Born: December 18, 1920; Philadelphia
- Died: May 1, 1985 (aged 64)
- Education: Princeton University; University of California, Berkeley
- Known for: Barankin bound Arrow-Barankin-Blackwell theorem
- Awards: Guggenheim Fellowship (1956)
- Scientific career
- Fields: Mathematics; Statistics
- Workplaces: University of California, Berkeley
- Thesis: The Characteristic Values of Linear Transformations (1946)
- Doctoral advisor: Alfred L. Foster
- Doctoral students: Philip Wolfe

Edward William Barankin (1920–1985) was an American mathematician and statistician.

His early work on the theory of sufficient statistics was highly regarded at the time, and is still cited. About 1950 he started developing a new, rather complicated theory of stochastic processes and behavior and, although he continued to do excellent work in other areas, including sufficient statistics and programming in operational research, his dominant research interest for the rest of his life was his process theory. In his theory, as in the theories of Keynes, Carnap, and Jeffreys, when the relationships among events are adequately described, the probabilities of the events can be calculated from their descriptions. Most of his United States colleagues never really understood his approach to stochastic processes, but his work was highly regarded in Japan, and was published in several Japanese statistical journals. Indeed, in recognition of his work he was appointed Honorary Member of the Institute of Statistical Mathematics, Tokyo, in 1975. His process theory was also highly regarded by colleagues at the University of New Mexico, where he spent several periods as visiting professor at the Institute of Mathematics.

He received his A.B. from Princeton University in 1941 and his Ph.D. in mathematics from the University of California, Berkeley in 1946. For the academic year 1946–1947 he was Hermann Weyl's assistant at the Institute for Advanced Study. At U. C. Berkeley he was a professor of mathematics from 1947 to 1955 and a professor of statistics from 1955 to 1985.

Upon his death, Edward W. Barankin was survived by his former wife, Claire Barankin Wasser, two sons, Joseph Paul Barankin and Barry Alexander Barankin, and two grandsons, Nathan Robert Barankin and Micha David Barankin. His granddaughter, Elizabeth Alexandra Meghan Barankin, was born a year and a half after his death.
