= Noether Lecture =

Lecture series established by the Association for Women in Mathematics

The Noether Lecture is a distinguished lecture series that honors women "who have made fundamental and sustained contributions to the mathematical sciences". The Association for Women in Mathematics (AWM) established the annual lectures in 1980 as the Emmy Noether Lectures, in honor of one of the leading mathematicians of her time. In 2013 it was renamed the AWM-AMS Noether Lecture and since 2015 is sponsored jointly with the American Mathematical Society (AMS). The recipient delivers the lecture at the yearly American Joint Mathematics Meetings held in January.

The ICM Emmy Noether Lecture is an additional lecture series, sponsored by the International Mathematical Union. Beginning in 1994 this lecture was delivered at the International Congress of Mathematicians, held every four years. In 2010 the lecture series was made permanent.

The 2021 Noether Lecture was supposed to have been given by Andrea Bertozzi of UCLA, but it was cancelled. The cancellation was made during the George Floyd protests: "This decision comes as many of this nation rise up in protest over racial discrimination and brutality by police". Although she intended to speak on other topics, Bertozzi is known for research on the mathematics of policing, and in a letter to the AMS, Sol Garfunkel concluded that "the reason for her exclusion was one of her areas of research". In an official blog of the AMS, a group calling themselves The Just Mathematics Collective called for a boycott of mathematical collaborations with police, dismissing Garfunkel's letter as "intended to further dismiss the boycott" and celebrating the cancellation of Bertozzi's lecture.

== Noether Lecturer ==
Year	Name	Lecture title
1980	F. Jessie MacWilliams	A Survey of Coding Theory
1981	Olga Taussky-Todd	The Many Aspects of Pythagorean Triangles
1982	Julia Robinson	Functional Equations in Arithmetic
1983	Cathleen S. Morawetz	How Do Perturbations of the Wave Equation Work
1984	Mary Ellen Rudin	Paracompactness
1985	Jane Cronin Scanlon	A Model of Cardiac Fiber: Problems in Singularly Perturbed Systems
1986	Yvonne Choquet-Bruhat	On Partial Differential Equations of Gauge Theories and General Relativity
1987	Joan S. Birman	Studying Links via Braids
1988	Karen K. Uhlenbeck	Moment Maps in Stable Bundles: Where Analysis Algebra and Topology Meet
1989	Mary F. Wheeler	Large Scale Modeling of Problems Arising in Flow in Porous Media
1990	Bhama Srinivasan	The Invasion of Geometry into Finite Group Theory
1991	Alexandra Bellow	Almost Everywhere Convergence: The Case for the Ergodic Viewpoint
1992	Nancy Kopell	Oscillators and Networks of Them: Which Differences Make a Difference
1993	Linda Keen	Hyperbolic Geometry and Spaces of Riemann Surfaces
1994	Lesley Sibner	Analysis in Gauge Theory
1995	Judith D. Sally	Measuring Noetherian Rings
1996	Olga Oleinik	On Some Homogenization Problems for Differential Operators
1997	Linda Preiss Rothschild	How Do Real Manifolds Live in Complex Space
1998	Dusa McDuff	Symplectic Structures - A New Approach to Geometry
1999	Krystyna M. Kuperberg	Aperiodic Dynamical Systems
2000	Margaret H. Wright	The Mathematics of Optimization
2001	Sun-Yung Alice Chang	Nonlinear Equations in Conformal Geometry
2002	Lenore Blum	Computing Over the Reals: Where Turing Meets Newton
2003	Jean Taylor	Five Little Crystals and How They Grew
2004	Svetlana Katok	Symbolic Dynamics for Geodesic Flows
2005	Lai-Sang Young	From Limit Cycles to Strange Attractors
2006	Ingrid Daubechies	Mathematical Results and Challenges in Learning Theory
2007	Karen Vogtmann	Automorphisms of Groups, Outer Space, and Beyond
2008	Audrey A. Terras	Fun With Zeta Functions of Graphs
2009	Fan Chung Graham	New Directions in Graph Theory
2010	Carolyn S. Gordon	You Can't Hear the Shape of a Manifold
2011	Susan Montgomery	Orthogonal Representations: From Groups to Hopf Algebras
2012	Barbara Keyfitz	Conservation Laws - Not Exactly a la Noether
2013	Raman Parimala	A Hasse principle for quadratic forms over function fields
2014	Georgia Benkart	Walking on Graphs the Representation Theory Way
2015	Wen-Ching Winnie Li	Modular forms for congruence and noncongruence
2016	Karen E. Smith	The Power of Noether's Ring Theory in Understanding Singularities of Complex Algebraic Varieties
2017	Lisa Jeffrey	Cohomology of Symplectic Quotients
2018	Jill Pipher	Nonsmooth Boundary Value Problems
2019	Bryna Kra	Dynamics of systems with low complexity
2020	Birgit Speh	Branching Laws for Representations of Non Compact Orthogonal Groups
2021		Lecture cancelled in 2021 (see above)
2022	Marianna Csörnyei	The Kakeya needle problem for rectifiable sets
2023	Laura DeMarco	Rigidity and uniformity in algebraic dynamics
2024	Anne Schilling	The Ubiquity of Crystal Bases
2025	Neena Gupta	The Abhyankar-Sathaye Conjecture for Linear Hyperplanes
2026	Monica Vișan	Well-Posedness and the Method of Commuting Flows

== ICM Emmy Noether Lecturers ==
Year	Name
1994	Olga Ladyzhenskaya
1998	Cathleen Synge Morawetz
2002	Hesheng Hu
2006	Yvonne Choquet-Bruhat
2010	Idun Reiten
2014	Georgia Benkart
2018	Sun-Yung Alice Chang
2022	Marie-France Vignéras
2026	Karen Vogtmann

== See also ==
- Falconer Lecture
- Kovalevsky Lecture
- List of mathematics awards
- List of things named after Emmy Noether
