= Joyce McLaughlin =

American mathematician (1939–2017)

Joyce Rogers McLaughlin (8 October 1939 – 23 October 2017) was an American mathematician, the Ford Foundation Professor of Mathematics at Rensselaer Polytechnic Institute. Her research interests were primarily in applied mathematics, and in particular in inverse problems.

== Academic career ==
McLaughlin did her undergraduate studies at Kansas State University. After earning a master's degree from the University of Maryland, she moved to the University of California, Riverside for her doctoral studies, earning a Ph.D. in 1968 under the supervision of Joaquin Basilio Diaz. She joined the Rensselaer faculty in 1978.

She was chair of the board of trustees of the Society for Industrial and Applied Mathematics from 1996 to 1998.

== Awards and honors ==
McLaughlin was an invited lecturer at the International Congress of Mathematicians in 1994. She was chosen by the Association for Women in Mathematics and the Society for Industrial and Applied Mathematics as the AWM-SIAM Sonia Kovalevsky Lecturer in 2004.

She became a fellow of the Society for Industrial and Applied Mathematics in 2009 and a fellow of the American Mathematical Society in 2013 in the inaugural class.
