= Jacobson–Bourbaki theorem =

Theorem used to extend Galois theory to field extensions that need not be separable

In algebra, the Jacobson–Bourbaki theorem is a theorem used to extend Galois theory to field extensions that need not be separable. It was introduced by Nathan Jacobson (1944) for commutative fields and extended to division rings by Jacobson (1947), and Henri Cartan (1947) who credited the result to unpublished work by Nicolas Bourbaki. The extension of Galois theory to normal extensions is called the Jacobson–Bourbaki correspondence, which replaces the correspondence between some subfields of a field and some subgroups of a Galois group by a correspondence between some sub division rings of a division ring and some subalgebras of an associative algebra.

The Jacobson–Bourbaki theorem implies both the usual Galois correspondence for subfields of a Galois extension, and Jacobson's Galois correspondence for subfields of a purely inseparable extension of exponent at most 1.

== Statement ==
Suppose that L is a division ring. The Jacobson–Bourbaki theorem states that there is a natural 1:1 correspondence between:

- Division rings K in L of finite index n (in other words L is a finite-dimensional left vector space over K).
- Unital K-algebras of finite dimension n (as K-vector spaces) contained in the ring of endomorphisms of the additive group of K.

The sub division ring and the corresponding subalgebra are each other's commutants.

Jacobson (1956, Chapter 7.2) gave an extension to sub division rings that might have infinite index, which correspond to closed subalgebras in the finite topology.

== Bibliography ==
- Cartan, Henri (1947), "Les principaux théorèmes de la théorie de Galois pour les corps non nécessairement commutatifs", Comptes rendus de l'Académie des Sciences, 224: 249–251, MR 0020983
- Cartan, Henri (1947), "Théorie de Galois pour les corps non commutatifs", Annales Scientifiques de l'École Normale Supérieure, Série 3, 64: 59–77, doi:10.24033/asens.942, ISSN 0012-9593, MR 0023237
- Jacobson, Nathan (1944), "Galois theory of purely inseparable fields of exponent one", American Journal of Mathematics, 66 (4): 645–648, doi:10.2307/2371772, ISSN 0002-9327, JSTOR 2371772, MR 0011079
- Jacobson, Nathan (1947), "A note on division rings", American Journal of Mathematics, 69 (1): 27–36, doi:10.2307/2371651, ISSN 0002-9327, JSTOR 2371651, MR 0020981
- Jacobson, Nathan (1956), Structure of rings, American Mathematical Society, Colloquium Publications, vol. 37, Providence, R.I.: American Mathematical Society, ISBN 978-0-8218-1037-8, MR 0081264
- Jacobson, Nathan (1964), Lectures in abstract algebra. Vol III: Theory of fields and Galois theory, D. Van Nostrand Co., Inc., Princeton, N.J.-Toronto, Ont.-London-New York, ISBN 978-0-387-90168-8, MR 0172871
- Kreimer, F. (2001) [1994], "Jacobson-Bourbaki_theorem", Encyclopedia of Mathematics, EMS Press
