= John Sarli =

- Occupations: Mathematician and academic

Academic background
- Education: A.B., Mathematics; Ph.D., Mathematics
- Alma mater: Brown University; University of California, Santa Cruz
- Thesis: On the Maximal Subgroups of ^{2}F_{4}(g) (1984)
- Doctoral advisor: Bruce Cooperstein

John Sarli is a mathematician and academic. He is a Professor Emeritus of mathematics at California State University at San Bernardino.

Sarli's research focuses on the geometry of groups of Lie type and the applications of hyperbolic geometry with his work published in Geometriae Dedicata, Journal of Geometry, Advances in Geometry, and the Journal of Elasticity.

== Education ==
In 1974, Sarli earned an A.B. in Mathematics from Brown University. He then pursued advanced studies and received his Ph.D. in Mathematics from the University of California, Santa Cruz in 1984.

== Career ==
Sarli was Chair of the Department of Mathematics at California State University, San Bernardino from 1988 to 1994. In 1999, he joined the Mathematics Diagnostic Testing Project (MDTP) Workgroup. The following year, he took on the role of site director at CSU San Bernardino when an MDTP site was set up there. He assumed the position of Chair of the MDTP Workgroup in 2002 and held the role until 2020. He holds the title of professor emeritus of Mathematics at California State University, San Bernardino.

== Research ==
Sarli, through his research, described an incidence structure for twisted groups 𝐺, where points are elementary abelian root subgroups establishing a correspondence between certain lines and planes in this structure, demonstrating that it induces a polarity on an embedded metasymplectic space. He showed that biharmonic functions, crucial for understanding equilibrium equations for elastic bodies, can be derived from a power series using matrix representations of 𝐶 and applied to describe solutions to planar equilibrium equations within Möbius plane geometry. His alignment of the geometry of root subgroups in 𝐺=PSp_{4}(𝑞) with a system of conics in the associated generalized quadrangle provided an interpretation of symplectic 2-transvections. Classifying the intrinsic conics in the hyperbolic plane, using collineation invariants, he offered metric characterizations and highlighted a natural duality among these classes, induced by an involution related to complementary angles of parallelism.

== Selected articles ==
- Sarli, J. (1988). The geometry of root subgroups in Ree groups of type 2 F 4. Geometriae Dedicata, 26(1), 1-28. https://doi.org/10.1007/BF00148014
- Sarli, J., & Torner, J. (1993). Representations of $\mathbb{C}$, biharmonic vector fields, and the equilibrium equation of planar elasticity. Journal of Elasticity, 32(3), 223–241. https://doi.org/10.1007/BF0013166
- Sarli, J., & McClurg, P. (2001). McClurg, P. (2001). A rank 3 tangent complex of 𝑃Sp4(𝑞), 𝑞 odd. Advances in Geometry, 1(4), 365–371. https://doi.org/10.1515/advg.2001.022
- Sarli, J. (2012). Conics in the hyperbolic plane intrinsic to the collineation group. Journal of Geometry, 103, 131–148. https://doi.org/10.1007/s00022-012-0115-5
