= Ronald DiPerna =

American mathematician

Ronald J. DiPerna (11 February 1947 – 8 January 1989) was an American mathematician, who worked on nonlinear partial differential equations.

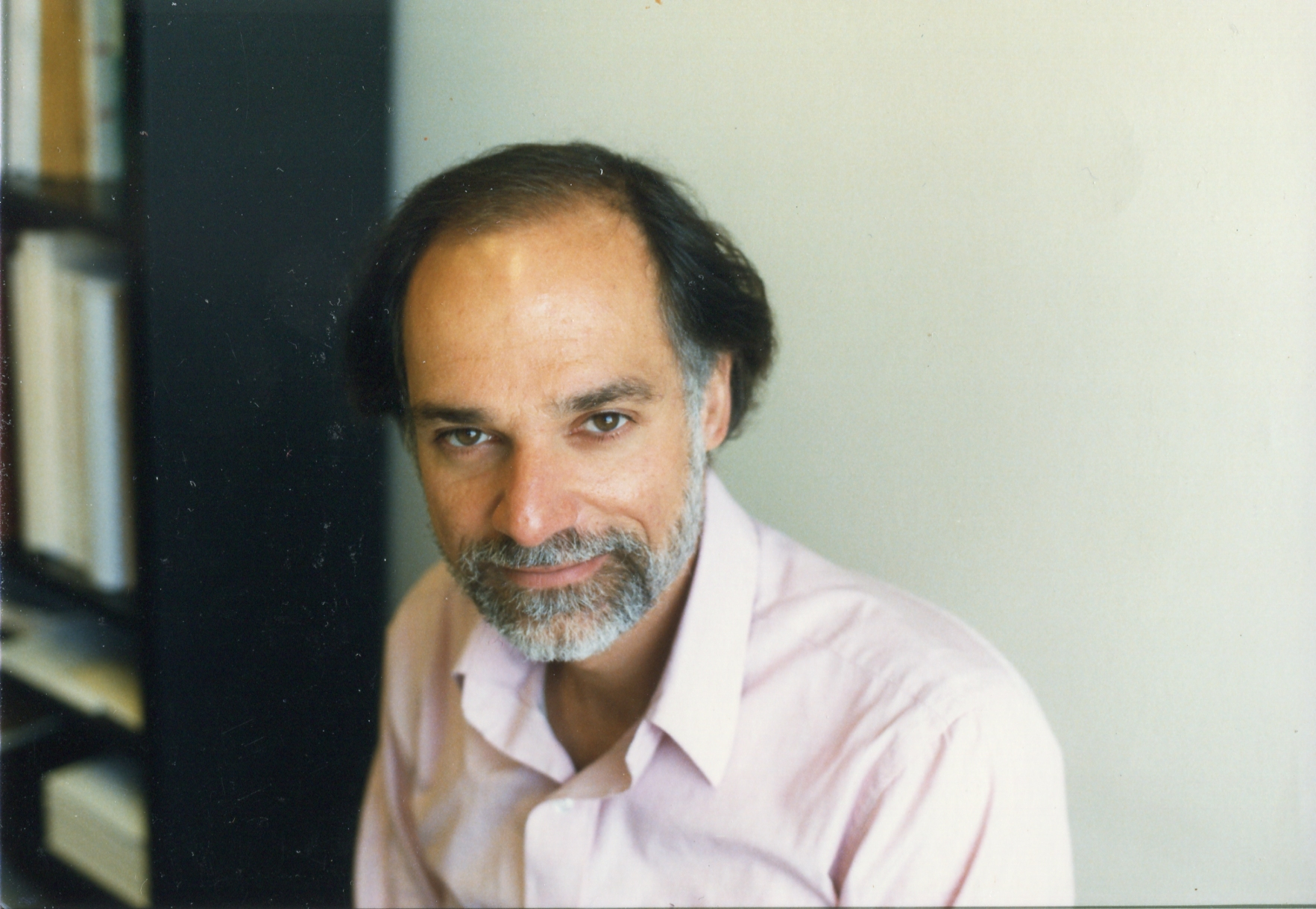
Ronald DiPerna, Berkeley 1985

Ronald Diperna was born in Somerville, Massachusetts in 1947, and did his undergraduate studies at Tufts University before being advised to attend graduate school by Professor George Leger. In 1972 DiPerna received from the Courant Institute of Mathematical Sciences his Ph.D. under James Glimm with thesis Global solutions to a class of nonlinear hyperbolic systems. He held academic positions at Brown University, the University of Michigan, the University of Wisconsin, and Duke University, before he became in 1985 a professor at the University of California, Berkeley. He died unexpectedly at age 41 shortly after the end of a sabbatical year as a visiting scholar at the Institute for Advanced Study.

DiPerna was known for his work on nonlinear partial differential equations, especially those that are important in fluid dynamics and the kinetic theory of gases. Probably his best known work is his development and application of the method of compensated compactness. This is a very powerful method for controlling oscillation and thereby proving existence theorems. DiPerna proved existence of weak solutions in the large for the equations of compressible gas dynamics and obtained important results concerning the uniqueness of solutions, their large time behavior, and their local regularity as elements of the appropriate abstract spaces.

In the last part of his career he worked with Pierre-Louis Lions on integro-differential equations in the kinetic theory of gases (Cauchy problem for Boltzmann equations) and the plasma physics generalization (Vlasov equation). He also worked on singularities in compressible flow. DiPerna with Andrew Majda began in 1986 research on the question of the existence of solutions to the Euler equations in two dimensions with initial conditions that are found in the evolution of vortex sheets. DiPerna and Majda introduced the Concentration-Cancellation Method.

DiPerna was a Guggenheim Fellow for the academic year 1984–1985 and a Sloan Fellow for the academic year 1978–1979. In 1986 he was an invited speaker at the International Congress of Mathematicians in Berkeley 1986 and gave a talk Compactness of solutions to nonlinear PDEs.

He was married to Maria E. Schonbek, a professor of mathematics at the University of California, Santa Cruz and had a daughter. He died in Princeton, New Jersey in 1989, and in his honor the University of California at Berkeley established the DiPerna Lectures in Applied Mathematics.

== Selected publications ==
- Diperna, Ronald J. (1973). "Global solutions to a class of nonlinear hyperbolic systems of equations". Comm. Pure Appl. Math. 26: 1–28. doi:10.1002/cpa.3160260102.
- Diperna, Ronald J. (1973). "Existence in the large for quasilinear hyperbolic conservation laws". Arch. Rational Mech. Anal. 52 (3): 244–257. Bibcode:1973ArRMA..52..244D. doi:10.1007/BF00247735. S2CID 122077205.
- Uniqueness of solutions to hyperbolic conservation laws, Indiana Univ. Math. J. 28 (1979), 137–188.
- Diperna, R. J. (1983). "Convergence of approximate solutions to conservation laws". Arch. Rational Mech. Anal. 82 (1): 27–70. Bibcode:1983ArRMA..82...27D. doi:10.1007/BF00251724. hdl:10338.dmlcz/102415.
- Convergence of the viscosity method for isentropic gas dynamics, Comm. Math. Phys. 91 (1983), 1–30, Online
- Diperna, Ronald J. (1985). "Measure-valued solutions to conservation laws". Arch. Rational Mech. Anal. 88 (3): 223–270. Bibcode:1985ArRMA..88..223D. doi:10.1007/BF00752112. S2CID 119711966.
- Compensated Compactness and general systems of Conservation Laws, Transactions AMS, 292, 1985, 383-420
- with Pierre-Louis Lions: Diperna, R. J.; Lions, P. L. (1989). "Global weak solutions of Vlasov-Maxwell systems". Comm. Pure Appl. Math. 42 (6): 729–757. doi:10.1002/cpa.3160420603.
- with Pierre-Louis Lions: Diperna, R. J.; Lions, P. L. (1989). "On the Cauchy problem for Boltzmann equations: global existence and weak stability". Annals of Mathematics. 130 (2): 321–366. doi:10.2307/1971423. JSTOR 1971423.
- with Lions: "Ordinary differential equations, Sobolev spaces and transport theory". Inventiones Mathematicae. 98: 511–547. 1989. doi:10.1007/BF01393835. S2CID 123097609.
