= Canić =

Canić is a South Slavic surname found in Serbia and Croatia.

In Croatia, there are about 10 people surnamed Canić in total.

Notable people with this surname include:

- Milka Canić (1944–2016), Serbian quiz show host

== See also ==
- Čanić
