= Fauci (surname) =

Fauci is an Italian surname. It is derived from the Sicilian word for "sickle", and originated as an occupational surname referring metonymically to sickle makers or people who used sickles. In Italy, 151 families bear the surname Fauci, with 67 in Sicily and 35 in Campania. The 2010 United States census found 510 people with the surname Fauci, making it the 42,511th-most-common name in the country. This represented an increase from 483 (42,289th-most-common) in the 2000 Census. In both censuses, about 97% of the bearers of the surname identified as non-Hispanic white.

Notable people with this surname include:

- Anthony Fauci (born 1940), American immunologist
- Lisa Fauci (born 1960), American mathematics professor

== See also ==
- Christine Grady (born 1952), American nurse and bioethicist; wife of Anthony Fauci
- Thomas V. LaFauci (1918–2002), American politician
