= Bhama Srinivasan =

Indian-American mathematician

- பாமா ஸ்ரீநிவாசன்
- Born: 22 April 1935; Madras, Madras Presidency, British India (now Chennai, Tamil Nadu, India)
- Died: 6 November 2025 (aged 90); Chicago, Illinois, USA
- Education: University of Madras, University of Manchester, University of British Columbia
- Known for: Pure mathematical research
- Scientific career
- Fields: scientist
- Workplaces: Clark University, University of Illinois, University of Essen, Sydney University, Science University of Tokyo
- Doctoral advisor: J. A. Green

Bhama Srinivasan (22 April 1935 – 6 November 2025) was a mathematician known for her work in the representation theory of finite groups. Her contributions were honored with the 1990 Noether Lecture. She served as president of the Association for Women in Mathematics from 1981 to 1983.

Srinivasan earned her Ph.D. in 1959 with her dissertation Problems on Modular Representations of Finite Groups under J. A. Green at the University of Manchester. She was a Professor at the University of Illinois at Chicago. She has had five doctoral students. She has co-authored a number of papers with Paul Fong in modular representation theory and Deligne–Lusztig theory.

== Early life and education ==
Srinivasan was born in present-day Chennai, Tamil Nadu, India on 22 April 1935. She attended the University of Madras, where she earned her bachelor of arts degree in 1954 and her master of science degree in 1955. She traveled to England for her doctoral study. She remained in England to commence her professional academic career as a lecturer in mathematics at the University of Keele from 1960 through 1964. She then pursued a postdoctoral fellowship at the University of British Columbia through the National research Council of Canada from 1965 through 1966. She returned home to India to teach at the Ramanujan Institute of Mathematics of her Alma mater, the University of Madras, from 1966 though 1970.

== Career ==
Srinivasan then immigrated to the United States, where she taught for the next decade at Clark University in Worcester, Massachusetts, as an associate professor. In 1977, she became a naturalized citizen of the United States. That year, she was a member of the Institute for Advanced Study in Princeton, New Jersey. In 1980, she commenced her longstanding tenure at the University of Illinois as a professor of mathematics at the Chicago Circle campus.

Srinivasan has distinguished herself in her field throughout her career. In January 1979, she delivered an American Mathematical Society (AMS) Invited Address "Representations of classical groups" at the Joint Mathematics Meetings in Biloxi, Mississippi. She has also been invited to fill visiting professorships internationally at the Ecole Normale Superieure in Paris, the University of Essen in Germany, Sydney University, and the Science University of Tokyo in Japan. She has served as an editor for several journals in her field: Proceedings of the AMS (from 1983 through 1987); Communications in Algebra (from 1978 through 1984); Mathematical Surveys and Monographs (from 1991 through 1993). From 1991 through 1994, she served on the Editorial Boards Committee of the AMS.

Srinivasan collaborated with Paul Fong on finite groups of Lie type, and this work has been linked to Lusztig's research on quantum groups, thus crossing over between mathematics and physics. Although Srinivasan generally advocated pure mathematical research, resisting the temptation to find a practical application for all mathematics, she nevertheless got excited by the application of her research to physics.

== Awards and honors ==
In 2012 she became a fellow of the American Mathematical Society. In 2017, she was selected as a fellow of the Association for Women in Mathematics in the inaugural class. She was included in a deck of playing cards featuring notable women mathematicians published by the Association of Women in Mathematics.

== Personal life ==
Srinivasan died 6 November 2025.

== Selected works ==
- Srinivasan, Bhama (1968), "The characters of the finite symplectic group Sp(4,q)", Transactions of the American Mathematical Society, 131 (2): 488–525, doi:10.2307/1994960, ISSN 0002-9947, JSTOR 1994960, MR 0220845
- Srinivasan, Bhama (1979), Representations of finite Chevalley groups. A survey., Lecture Notes in Mathematics, vol. 764, Berlin, New York: Springer-Verlag, ISBN 978-3-540-09716-7
- Fong, Paul; Srinivasan, Bhama (1982), "The blocks of finite general linear and unitary groups", Inventiones Mathematicae, 69 (1): 109–153, Bibcode:1982InMat..69..109F, doi:10.1007/BF01389188, ISSN 0020-9910, MR 0671655, S2CID 122517052
