= James Glimm =

American mathematician

James G. Glimm
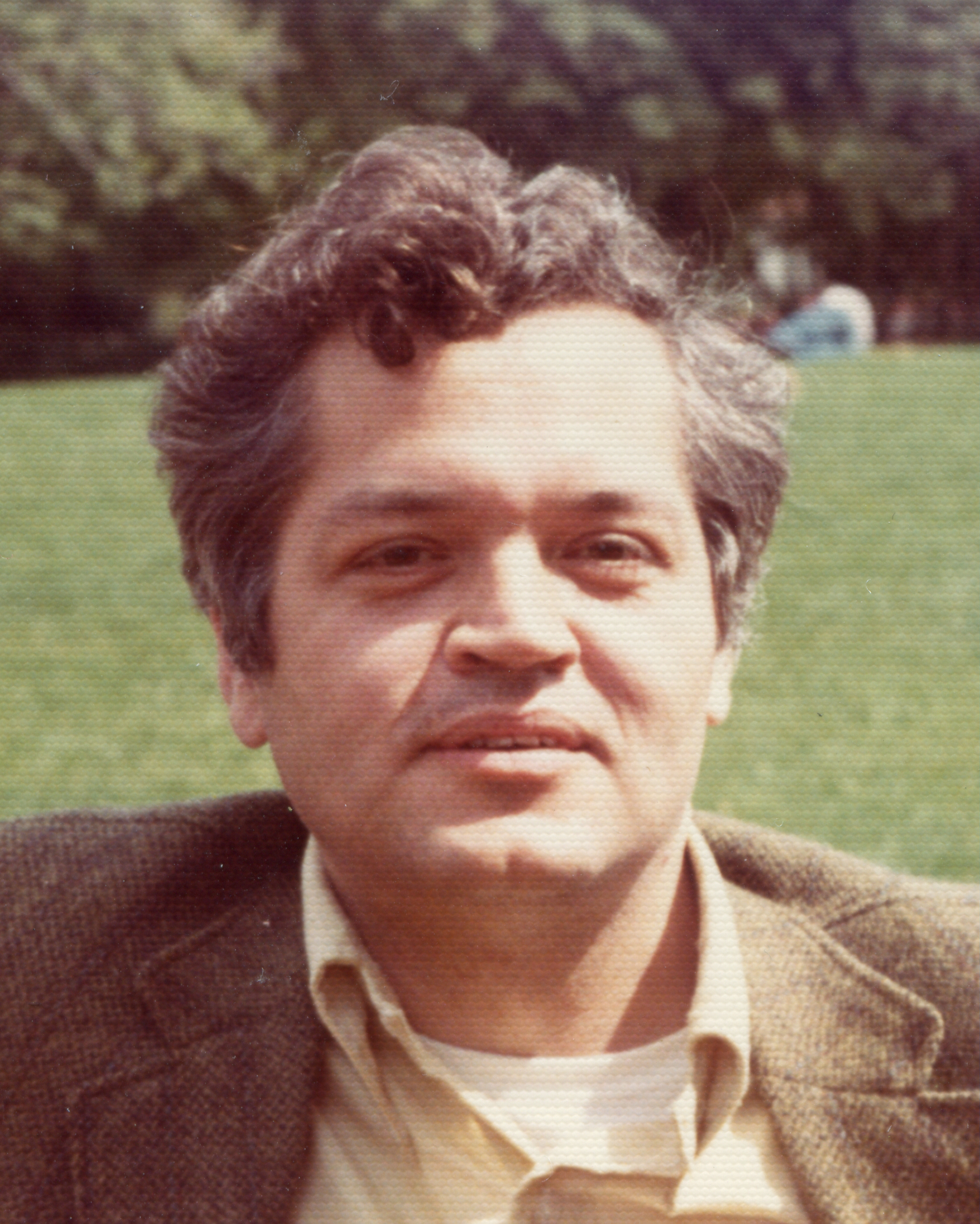
- Born: James Gilbert Glimm; March 24, 1934 (age 92); Peoria, Illinois, U.S.
- Education: Columbia University
- Known for: Constructive quantum field theory
- Awards: Guggenheim Fellowship (1963); ICM Speaker (1974); Heineman Prize (1980); Leroy P. Steele Prize (1993); National Medal of Science (2002)
- Scientific career
- Fields: Mathematics
- Workplaces: Institute of Advanced Study; MIT; The Rockefeller University; New York University; Stony Brook University
- Doctoral advisor: Richard Kadison
- Doctoral students: Sunčica Čanić; Ronald DiPerna; Thomas Spencer

James Gilbert Glimm (born March 24, 1934) is an American mathematician, former president of the American Mathematical Society, and distinguished professor at Stony Brook University. He has made many contributions in the areas of pure and applied mathematics.

== Life and career ==
Glimm discusses his contributions to the world of computer science through mathematical analysis and physics.

James Glimm was born in Peoria, Illinois, United States on March 24, 1934. He received his BA in engineering from Columbia University in 1956. He continued on to graduate school at Columbia where he received his Ph.D. in mathematics in 1959; his advisor was Richard V. Kadison. Glimm was at New York University, and at Rockefeller University, before arriving at Stony Brook University in 1989.

He has been noted for contributions to C*-algebras, quantum field theory, partial differential equations, fluid dynamics, scientific computing, and the modeling of petroleum reservoirs. Together with Arthur Jaffe, he has founded a subject called constructive quantum field theory. His early work in the theory of operator algebras was seminal, and today the "Glimm algebras" that bear his name continue to play an important role in this area of research. More recently, the United States Department of Energy adopted Glimm's front-track methodology for shock-wave calculations, e.g., simulating weapons performance.

Glimm was elected to the National Academy of Sciences in 1984. He was an Invited Speaker of the ICM in 1970 at Nice and a Plenary Speaker of the ICM in 1974 at Vancouver. In 1993, Glimm was awarded the Leroy P. Steele Prize for his contribution to solving hyperbolic systems of partial differential equations. He won the National Medal of Science in 2002 "For his original approaches and creative contribution to an array of disciplines in mathematical analysis and mathematical physics". Starting January 1, 2007, he served a 2-year term as president of the American Mathematical Society. In 2012 he became a fellow of the American Mathematical Society.

== Appointments ==
| Years | Appointments |
|---|---|
| 1999- | Staff Member, Computational Science Center, Brookhaven National Laboratory |
| 1989- | Distinguished Professor, SUNY at Stony Brook |
| 1982-89 | Professor, Courant Institute of Mathematical Sciences, New York University |
| 1974-82 | Professor, The Rockefeller University |
| 1968-74 | Professor, Courant Institute of Mathematical Sciences, New York University |
| 1960-68 | Professor, Associate Professor, Assistant Professor, MIT |
| 1959-60 | Temporary Member, Institute for Advanced Study |

== See also ==
- Axioms by Glimm and Jaffe

== Selected publications ==
- Glimm, James (1965), "Solutions in the large for nonlinear hyperbolic systems of equations", Communications on Pure and Applied Mathematics, 18 (4): 697–715, doi:10.1002/cpa.3160180408
- Glimm, James (May 1960), "On a certain class of operator algebras.", Transactions of the American Mathematical Society, 95 (2): 318–340, doi:10.2307/1993294, JSTOR 1993294
- Glimm, James (September 1960), "A Stone-Weierstrass theorem for C*-algebras.", Annals of Mathematics, Second Series, 72 (2): 216–244, doi:10.2307/1970133, JSTOR 1970133
- Glimm, James (May 1961), "Type I C*-algebras.", Annals of Mathematics, Second Series, 73 (3): 572–612, doi:10.2307/1970319, JSTOR 1970319
- Glimm, James; et al. (1998), "Three-Dimensional Front Tracking", SIAM J. Sci. Comput., 19 (3): 703–727, Bibcode:1998SJSC...19..703G, CiteSeerX 10.1.1.57.569, doi:10.1137/S1064827595293600
- Glimm, James; et al. (March 1981), "Front tracking for hyperbolic systems", Advances in Applied Mathematics, 2 (1): 91–119, doi:10.1016/0196-8858(81)90040-3
- Glimm, James; Jaffe, Arthur (March 1970), "The λ (φ4) 2 quantum field theory without cutoffs: II. the field operators and the approximate vacuum", Annals of Mathematics, Second Series, 91 (2): 362–401, doi:10.2307/1970582, JSTOR 1970582
- Glimm, James; Jaffe, Arthur (1973), "Positivity of the φ 34 Hamiltonian.", Fortschritte der Physik, 21 (7): 327–376, Bibcode:1973ForPh..21..327G, doi:10.1002/prop.19730210702
- (Book) Glimm, James; Jaffe, Arthur (1981), Quantum physics : a functional integral point of view, New york, NY: Springer, ISBN 9781468401219
- (Book) Glimm, James; Lax, Peter (1970), Decay of solutions of systems of nonlinear hyperbolic conservation laws, Memoirs of the American Mathematical Society, vol. 101, ISBN 0-8218-1801-5
