= Purely inseparable extension =

Algebraic concept

In algebra, a purely inseparable extension of fields is an extension k ⊆ K of fields of characteristic p > 0 such that every element of K is a root of an equation of the form x^{q} = a, with q a power of p and a in k. Purely inseparable extensions are sometimes called radicial extensions, which should not be confused with the similar-sounding but more general notion of radical extensions.

== Purely inseparable extensions ==
An algebraic extension $E\supseteq F$ is a purely inseparable extension if and only if for every $\alpha\in E\setminus F$, the minimal polynomial of $\alpha$ over F is not a separable polynomial. If F is any field, the trivial extension $F\supseteq F$ is purely inseparable; for the field F to possess a non-trivial purely inseparable extension, it must be imperfect as outlined in the above section.

Several equivalent and more concrete definitions for the notion of a purely inseparable extension are known. If $E\supseteq F$ is an algebraic extension with (non-zero) prime characteristic p, then the following are equivalent:

1. E is purely inseparable over F.
2. For each element $\alpha\in E$, there exists $n\geq 0$ such that $\alpha^{p^n}\in F$.
3. Each element of E has minimal polynomial over F of the form $X^{p^n}-a$ for some integer $n\geq 0$ and some element $a\in F$.

It follows from the above equivalent characterizations that if $E=F[\alpha]$ (for F a field of prime characteristic) such that $\alpha^{p^n}\in F$ for some integer $n\geq 0$, then E is purely inseparable over F. (To see this, note that the set of all x such that $x^{p^n}\in F$ for some $n\geq 0$ forms a field; since this field contains both $\alpha$ and F, it must be E, and by condition 2 above, $E\supseteq F$ must be purely inseparable.)

If F is an imperfect field of prime characteristic p, choose $a\in F$ such that a is not a pth power in F, and let f(X) = X^{p} − a. Then f has no root in F, and so if E is a splitting field for f over F, it is possible to choose $\alpha$ with $f(\alpha)=0$. In particular, $\alpha^{p}=a$ and by the property stated in the paragraph directly above, it follows that $F[\alpha]\supseteq F$ is a non-trivial purely inseparable extension (in fact, $E=F[\alpha]$, and so $E\supseteq F$ is automatically a purely inseparable extension).

Purely inseparable extensions do occur naturally; for example, in algebraic geometry over fields of prime characteristic. If K is a field of characteristic p, and if V is an algebraic variety over K of dimension greater than zero, the function field K(V) is a purely inseparable extension over the subfield K(V)^{p} of pth powers (this follows from condition 2 above). Such extensions occur in the context of multiplication by p on an elliptic curve over a finite field of characteristic p.

=== Properties ===
- If the characteristic of a field F is a (non-zero) prime number p, and if $E\supseteq F$ is a purely inseparable extension, then if $F\subseteq K\subseteq E$, K is purely inseparable over F and E is purely inseparable over K. Furthermore, if [E : F] is finite, then it is a power of p, the characteristic of F.
- Conversely, if $F\subseteq K\subseteq E$ is such that $F\subseteq K$ and $K\subseteq E$ are purely inseparable extensions, then E is purely inseparable over F.
- An algebraic extension $E\supseteq F$ is an inseparable extension if and only if there is some $\alpha\in E\setminus F$ such that the minimal polynomial of $\alpha$ over F is not a separable polynomial (i.e., an algebraic extension is inseparable if and only if it is not separable; note, however, that an inseparable extension is not the same thing as a purely inseparable extension). If $E\supseteq F$ is a finite degree non-trivial inseparable extension, then [E : F] is necessarily divisible by the characteristic of F.
- If $E\supseteq F$ is a finite degree normal extension, and if $K=\mbox{Fix}(\mbox{Gal}(E/F))$, then K is purely inseparable over F and E is separable over K.

== Galois correspondence for purely inseparable extensions ==
Jacobson (1937, 1944) introduced a variation of Galois theory for purely inseparable extensions of exponent 1, where the Galois groups of field automorphisms in Galois theory are replaced by restricted Lie algebras of derivations. The simplest case is for finite index purely inseparable extensions K⊆L of exponent at most 1 (meaning that the pth power of every element of L is in K). In this case the Lie algebra of K-derivations of L is a restricted Lie algebra that is also a vector space of dimension n over L, where [L:K] = p^{n}, and the intermediate fields in L containing K correspond to the restricted Lie subalgebras of this Lie algebra that are vector spaces over L. Although the Lie algebra of derivations is a vector space over L, it is not in general a Lie algebra over L, but is a Lie algebra over K of dimension n[L:K] = np^{n}.

A purely inseparable extension is called a modular extension if it is a tensor product of simple extensions, so in particular every extension of exponent 1 is modular, but there are non-modular extensions of exponent 2 (Weisfeld 1965). Sweedler (1968) and Gerstenhaber & Zaromp (1970) gave an extension of the Galois correspondence to modular purely inseparable extensions, where derivations are replaced by higher derivations.

== See also ==
- Jacobson–Bourbaki theorem
