= Jacobson's conjecture =

Mathematical problem in ring theory

In abstract algebra, Jacobson's conjecture is an open problem in ring theory concerning the intersection of powers of the Jacobson radical of a Noetherian ring.

It has only been proven for special types of Noetherian rings, so far. Examples exist to show that the conjecture can fail when the ring is not Noetherian on a side, so it is absolutely necessary for the ring to be two-sided Noetherian.

The conjecture is named for the algebraist Nathan Jacobson who posed the first version of the conjecture.

== Statement ==
For a ring R with Jacobson radical J, the nonnegative powers $J^n$ are defined by using the product of ideals.

Jacobson's conjecture: In a right-and-left Noetherian ring, $\bigcap_{n\in \mathbb{N}}J^n=\{0\}.$

In other words: "The only element of a Noetherian ring in all powers of J is 0."

The original conjecture posed by Jacobson in 1956 asked about noncommutative one-sided Noetherian rings, however Israel Nathan Herstein produced a counterexample in 1965, and soon afterwards, Arun Vinayak Jategaonkar produced a different example which was a left principal ideal domain. From that point on, the conjecture was reformulated to require two-sided Noetherian rings.

== Partial results ==
Jacobson's conjecture has been verified for particular types of Noetherian rings:

- Commutative Noetherian rings all satisfy Jacobson's conjecture. This is a consequence of the Krull intersection theorem.
- Fully bounded Noetherian rings
- Noetherian rings with Krull dimension 1
- Noetherian rings satisfying the second layer condition
