= Alfred Foster (mathematician) =

American mathematician (1904–1994)

Alfred Leon Foster
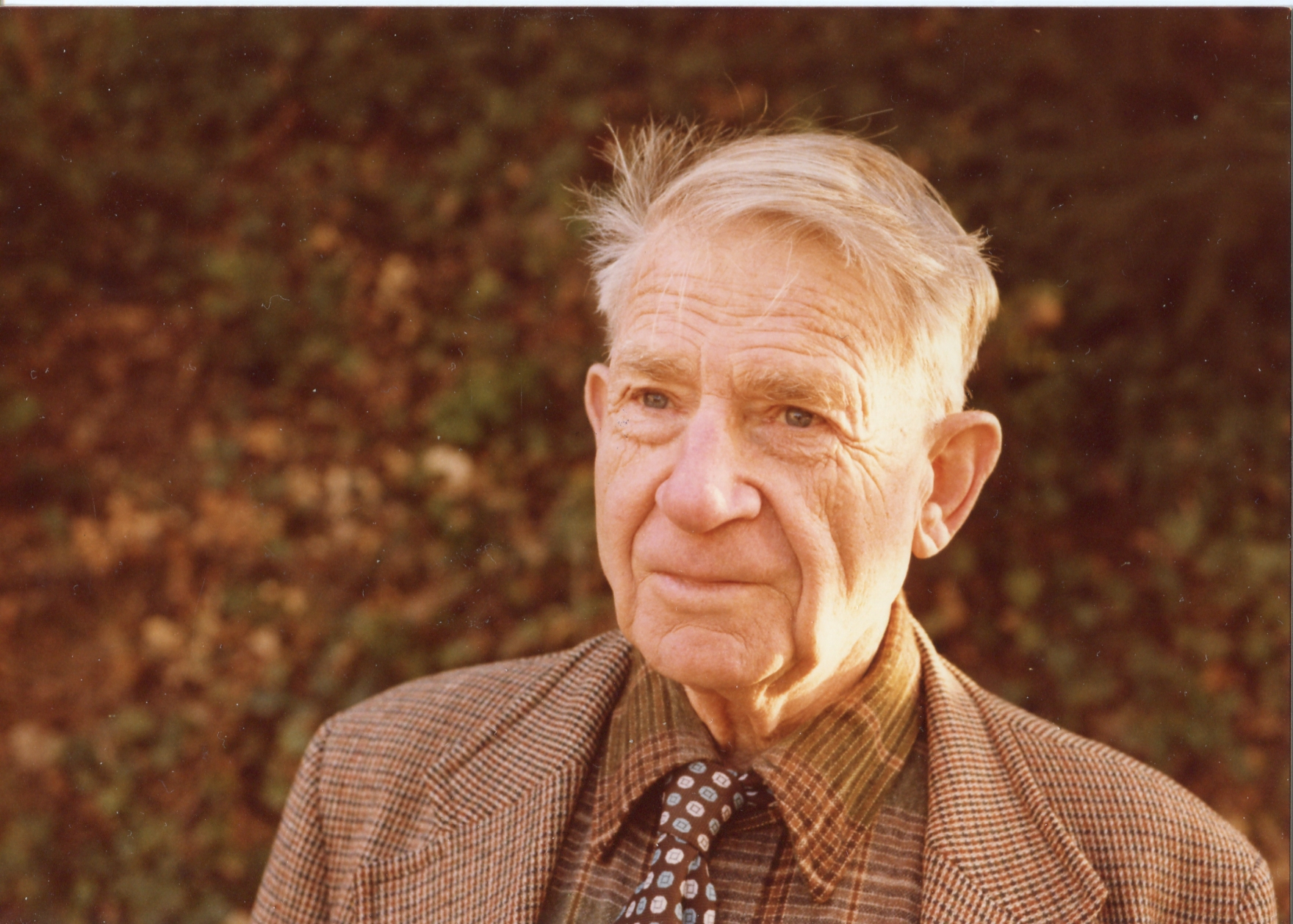
- Born: July 13, 1904; New York City, New York, United States
- Died: December 24, 1994 (aged 90); Berkeley, California, United States
- Education: California Institute of Technology (1926, B.S.); Princeton University (1931, Ph. D.)
- Known for: Primal algebra, Boolean-like ring
- Spouse: Else Wagner
- Scientific career
- Thesis: Formal Logic in Finite Terms (1931)
- Doctoral advisor: Alonzo Church
- Other academic advisors: Eric Temple Bell
- Doctoral students: Edward Barankin; Frank Harary; Arthur Knoebel

Alfred Leon Foster (1904-1994) was an American mathematician. He was a professor at the University of California, Berkeley, from 1934 until 1971. In 1932, he was an Invited Speaker at the ICM in Zürich.

In 1934, he accepted a regular position at Berkeley. At that time, Griffith Evans was Head of the Mathematics Department and was charged by President Sproul with building a first-class mathematics center, which he did. Alfred Foster and Charles Morrey (the first department chairman after Evans' retirement) were Evans' first two appointments. Except for subsequent sabbatical leaves, spent most notably in Freiburg and Tübingen, Foster served continuously at Berkeley until his retirement at the then-mandatory age of 67 in 1971.

Foster's Ph.D. dissertation and his first few papers were in mathematical logic. From this point, he soon focused on the related theory of Boolean algebras and Boolean rings and was thus led from logic to algebra. He extensively studied the role of duality in Boolean theory. Subsequently, he developed a theory of n-ality for certain rings, which played for n-valued logics the role of Boolean rings vis-a-vis Boolean algebras. The late Benjamin Bernstein of the Berkeley mathematics faculty was his collaborator in some of this research. This work culminated in his seminal paper "The Theory of Boolean-like Rings", appearing in 1946.

Foster was married to Else Wagner; their marriage produced four children and eight grandchildren.

== Selected publications ==
- Foster, AL (1938). "Natural Systems". Proc Natl Acad Sci U S A. 24 (4): 185–187. Bibcode:1938PNAS...24..185F. doi:10.1073/pnas.24.4.185. PMC 1077064. PMID 16588219.
- Foster, AL (1941). "Natural Systems: The Structure of Abstract Monotone Sequences". Proc Natl Acad Sci U S A. 27 (6): 325–327. Bibcode:1941PNAS...27..325F. doi:10.1073/pnas.27.6.325. PMC 1078331. PMID 16588468.
- Foster, Alfred L. (1946). "The theory of Boolean-like rings". Trans. Amer. Math. Soc. 59: 166–187. doi:10.1090/s0002-9947-1946-0015045-5. MR 0015045.
- Foster, AL (1949). "The n-Ality Theory of Rings". Proc Natl Acad Sci U S A. 35 (1): 31–38. Bibcode:1949PNAS...35...31F. doi:10.1073/pnas.35.1.31. PMC 1062953. PMID 16588850.
- Foster, Alfred L. (1949). "On the permutational representation of general sets of operations by partition lattices". Trans. Amer. Math. Soc. 66 (2): 366–388. doi:10.1090/s0002-9947-1949-0030932-2. MR 0030932.
- Foster, Alfred L. (1950). "p-rings and their Boolean-vector representation". Acta Mathematica. 84 (1): 231–261. doi:10.1007/BF02414856.
- Foster, Alfred L. (1956). "On the finiteness of free (universal) algebras". Proc. Amer. Math. Soc. 7 (6): 1011–1013. doi:10.1090/s0002-9939-1956-0083980-x. MR 0083980.
