= Georgia Benkart =

American mathematician (1947–2022)

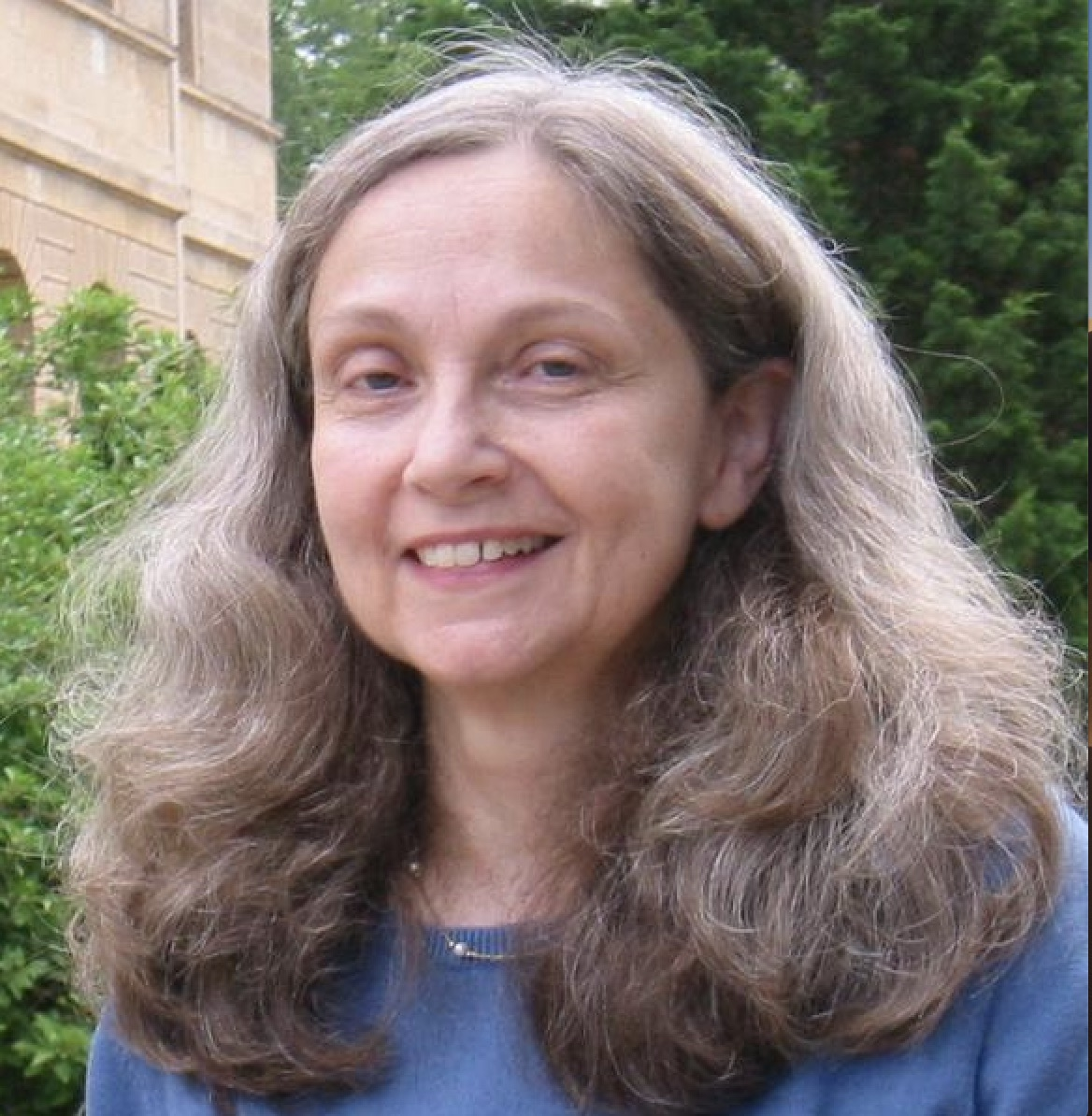
- Georgia Benkart in 2010
- Born: Georgia McClure Benkart; December 30, 1947; Youngstown, Ohio, U.S.
- Died: April 29, 2022 (aged 74); Madison, Wisconsin, U.S.
- Education: Ohio State University (BS); Yale University (PhD)
- Known for: Classification of simple modular Lie algebras
- Awards: President of Association for Women in Mathematics; Fellow of the American Mathematical Society; Fellow of the Association for Women in Mathematics; AWM-AMS Noether Lecturer; ICM Noether Lecturer; MAA Polya Lecturer
- Scientific career
- Fields: Lie algebras, Representation Theory, Combinatorics
- Workplaces: University of Wisconsin–Madison
- Doctoral advisor: Nathan Jacobson

Georgia McClure Benkart (December 30, 1947 – April 29, 2022) was an American mathematician who was known for her work in the structure and representation theory of Lie algebras and related algebraic structures. She published over 130 journal articles and co-authored three American Mathematical Society memoirs in four broad categories: modular Lie algebras; combinatorics of Lie algebra representations; graded algebras and superalgebras; and quantum groups and related structures.

== Education and career ==
Benkart received her BS degree in mathematics summa cum laude from the Ohio State University in 1970 and an MPhil in mathematics from Yale University in 1973. She completed her doctoral work at Yale under Nathan Jacobson and wrote a dissertation entitled Inner Ideals and the Structure of Lie Algebras. She was awarded a PhD in mathematics from the Yale University in 1974.

Upon completing her doctoral degree, Benkart began her long career at the University of Wisconsin–Madison, first as a MacDuffee Instructor and eventually as a E. B. Van Vleck Professor of Mathematics until she retired from teaching in 2006.

She held visiting positions at the Mathematical Sciences Research Institute in Berkeley, California, the Institute for Advanced Study in Princeton, New Jersey, the Aspen Center for Physics, and the University of Virginia. During her career, Benkart delivered over 350 invited talks including 3 plenary lectures at the Joint Mathematics Meetings and the Emmy Noether Lecture at the International Congress of Mathematicians in Seoul, South Korea in 2014.

== Personal life ==
Benkart was born on December 30, 1947, in Youngstown, Ohio, to George Benkart II and Florence K. Benkart. Her father served in the Army Corps of Engineers and her mother was a teacher in Youngstown's "ethnically rich south side."

Benkart died on April 29, 2022, aged 74, in Madison, Wisconsin.

== Research ==
Benkart made a contribution to the classification of simple modular Lie algebras. Her work with J. Marshall Osborn on toroidal rank-one Lie algebras became one of the building blocks of the classification. The complete description of Hamiltonian Lie Algebras (with Gregory, Osborn, Strade, Wilson) can stand alone, and also has applications in the theory of pro-p groups.

In 2009, she published, jointly with Thomas Gregory and Alexander Premet, the first complete proof of the recognition theorem for graded Lie algebras in characteristics at least 5.

In the early 1990s, Benkart and Efim Zelmanov started to work on classification of root-graded Lie algebras and intersection matrix algebras. The latter were introduced by Peter Slodowy in his work on singularities. Berman and Moody recognized that these algebras (generalizations of affine Kac–Moody algebras) are universal root graded Lie algebras and classified them for simply laced root systems. Benkart and Zelmanov tackled the remaining cases involving the Freudenthal magic square and extended this square to exceptional Lie superalgebras.

Later Benkart extended these results in two directions. In a series of papers with Alberto Elduque she developed the theory of root graded Lie superalgebras. In a second series of works with Bruce Allison, Arturo Pianzola, Erhard Neher, et al. she determined the universal central covers of these algebras.

One of the pillars of the representation theory of quantum groups (and applications to combinatorics) is Masaki Kashiwara's theory of crystal bases. These are highly invariant bases which are well suited for decompositions of tensor products. In a paper with Seok-Jin Kang and Kashiwara, Benkart extended the theory of crystal bases to quantum superalgebras.

Benkart's work on noncommutative algebras related to algebraic combinatorics became a basic tool in the construction of tensor categories.

== Service to the profession ==
Benkart served on several editorial boards including the boards of the American Mathematical Society for Surveys and Monographs and Abstracts, Communications in Algebra, and the Journal of Algebra. She served as the associate secretary of the American Mathematical Society for the Central Section from 2010 to 2020, and was a member of the governing council in 1995 and from 2010 to 2021. Benkart was active in the Association for Women in Mathematics (AWM) over many years, served as chair of the membership portfolio and the nominating committee, and helped plan the first AWM Research Symposium, which was also a celebration of the 40th anniversary of AWM.

== Awards and honors ==
Benkart received a Woodrow Wilson Fellowship from the Woodrow Wilson National Fellowship Foundation. Her work at Wisconsin was recognized by a Romnes Fellowship in 1985, a Distinguished Teaching Award in 1987, and a WARF Mid-Career Faculty Research Award in 1996. In 2008 the University of California Lie Groups and Lie Algebras meeting was held in Benkart's honor. Her talks and lectures include two invited lectures at the Joint Mathematics Meetings and a plenary lecture at a meeting of the Canadian Mathematical Society.

In 2000–2002 Benkart was named a Polya Lecturer by the Mathematical Association of America. She was elected a Fellow of the American Mathematical Society (AMS) in the inaugural class of 2013.

She was elected and served as president of the Association for Women in Mathematics from 2009 to 2011. In 2014 she was selected to deliver the AWM-AMS Noether Lecture. The title of her talk was Walking on Graphs the Representation Theory Way.

In 2014 at the International Congress of Mathematicians held in Seoul, she delivered the ICM Emmy Noether Lecture.

She was selected as a fellow of the Association for Women in Mathematics in the inaugural 2018 class.

In 2022, a tribute to her contributions to her field, "Gems from the Work of Georgia Benkart", appeared in the Notices of the American Mathematical Society.

The American Mathematical Society and the University of Wisconsin–Madison mathematics department posted remembrances of Benkart.

== Selected publications ==
- with Daniel Britten, Frank Lemire: Stability in Modules for Classical Lie Algebras: A Constructive Approach. Memoirs of the American Mathematical Society. Vol. 85. Providence, R.I.: American Mathematical Society. 1990. ISBN 9780821861530. MR 1010997.
- with Seok-Jin Kang, Masaki Kashiwara: Benkart, Georgia; Kang, Seok-Jin; Kashiwara, Masaki (2000). "Crystal bases for the quantum superalgebra U_{q}(𝔤𝔩(m,n))". J. Amer. Math. Soc. 13 (2): 295–331. arXiv:math/9810092. doi:10.1090/S0894-0347-00-00321-0. MR 1694051.
- with Bruce Allison, Yun Gao: Lie algebras graded by the root systems BC_{r}, r ≥ 2. Memoirs of the American Mathematical Society. Vol. 158. American Mathematical Society. 2002. ISBN 9780821864739. MR 1902499.
- with Thomas Gregory, Alexander Premet: Benkart, Georgia; Gregory, Thomas; Premet, Alexander (2009). The recognition theorem for graded Lie algebras in prime characteristic. Memoirs of the American Mathematical Society. Vol. 197. American Mathematical Society. arXiv:math/0508373. ISBN 9780821842263. MR 2488391.
