= Vivette Girault =

French mathematician (born 1943)

Vivette Girault (born 1943) is a French mathematician, whose research expertise lies in numerical analysis, finite element methods and computational fluid dynamics. She has been affiliated with Pierre and Marie Curie University.

Girault, was born in Nice, France, and attended high school in Caracas, Venezuela, received her bachelor's degree from McGill University in Montreal, Canada. After her undergraduate studies, Girault returned to France to study numerical analysis. She joined the applied mathematics faculty at the Université Paris, which was renamed the Université Pierre et Marie Curie (UPMC) and is currently known as Sorbonne Université. Girault was named professor emerita at the Sorbonne Université, CNRS, Laboratoire Jacque-Louis Lions, Paris, France.

Girault served on the editorial board of the American Mathematical Society journal Mathematics of Computation from 2006 to 2017.

Girault was selected by the Association for Women in Mathematics (AWM) and the Society for Industrial and Applied Mathematics (SIAM) to be the 2021 AWM-SIAM Sonia Kovalevsky Lecturer. She will deliver the lecture "From linear poroelasticity to nonlinear implicit elastic and related models" and receive the accompanying award at the SIAM annual meeting in Spokane, Washington in July 2021.

== Books ==
- Girault, Vivette; Raviart, Pierre-Arnaud (1979). Finite Element Approximation of the Navier-Stokes Equations. Lecture Notes in Mathematics. Vol. 749. Berlin-New York: Springer-Verlag. p. 200. doi:10.1007/BFb0063447. ISBN 3-540-09557-8. MR 0548867.
- Girault, Vivette; Raviart, Pierre-Arnaud (1986). Finite element methods for Naiver-Stokes equations. Theory and algorithms. Springer Series in Computational Mathematics. Berlin: Springer-Verlag. p. 374. doi:10.1007/978-3-642-61623-5. ISBN 3-540-15796-4. MR 0851383.
- Cioranescu, Doïna; Girault, Vivette; Rajagopal, Kumbakonam Ramamani (2016). Mechanics and mathematics of fluids of the differential type. Advances in Mechanics and Mathematics. Vol. 35. Switzerland: Springer, Cham. p. 394. Bibcode:2016mmfd.book.....C. doi:10.1007/978-3-319-39330-8. ISBN 978-3-319-39329-2. MR 3525798.
