= Benjamin Abram Bernstein =

American mathematician

Benjamin Abram Bernstein (20 May 1881, Pasvalys, Lithuania – 25 September 1964, Berkeley, California) was an American mathematician, specializing in mathematical logic.

== Biography ==
With his Jewish family, Bernstein immigrated as a child to the United States. After completing public primary education in 1897 in Baltimore, he completed in 1902 his secondary education at Baltimore City College, and then received in 1905 his A.B. degree from Johns Hopkins University. After completing two years of graduate study at Johns Hopkins University, he became in 1907 an instructor and continuing graduate student in mathematics at the University of California, Berkeley. There he received in 1913, with supervisor Mellen W. Haskell, his Ph.D. At Berkeley, Bernstein became in 1918 an assistant professor, in 1923 an associate professor, and in 1928 a full professor of mathematics, retiring in 1951 as professor emeritus.

When Professor Bernstein began his studies in mathematics, the subject of algebra of logic, or mathematical logic, was just beginning to receive intensive scholarly study, mainly from philosophers. Along with E. V. Huntington of Harvard, Professor Bernstein was a pioneer in this field from the mathematical point of view. ... During this early period in the history of mathematical logic, a notable event for the subject was the publication of Principia Mathematica, by Whitehead and Russell. Professor Bernstein was an intensive and critical student of this Principia and discussed it in many papers.

He was an Invited Speaker at the ICM in 1924 in Toronto. He was elected in 1931 a fellow of the American Association for the Advancement of Science. His doctoral students include Robert Levit and J.C.C. McKinsey.

In June 1920 in New York City, Professor Bernstein married Rose Davidson; her brother was the sculptor Jo Davidson. Bernstein was predeceased by his wife and upon his death was survived by a daughter and a granddaughter.

== Selected publications ==
- with A. O. Leuschner: Leuschner, A. O.; Bernstein, B. A. (1912). "Note on the graphical solutions of the fundamental equations in the short methods of determining orbits". Bull. Amer. Math. Soc. 18 (6): 294–298. doi:10.1090/s0002-9904-1912-02211-5. MR 1559207.
- Bernstein, B. A. (1916). "A simplification of the Whitehead-Huntington set of postulates for boolean algebras". Bull. Amer. Math. Soc. 22 (9): 458–459. doi:10.1090/s0002-9904-1916-02831-x. MR 1559829.
- Bernstein, B. A. (1916). "A set of four independent postulates for Boolean algebras". Trans. Amer. Math. Soc. 17: 50–52. doi:10.1090/s0002-9947-1916-1501029-5. MR 1501029.
- Bernstein, B. A. (1922). "The complete existential theory of Hurwitz's postulates for abelian groups and fields". Bull. Amer. Math. Soc. 28 (8): 397–399. doi:10.1090/s0002-9904-1922-03600-2. MR 1560594.
- Bernstein, B. A. (1924). "Operations with respect to which the elements of a Boolean algebra form a group". Trans. Amer. Math. Soc. 26 (2): 171–175. doi:10.1090/s0002-9947-1924-1501271-8. MR 1501271.
  - Errata for 1924 Trans. Amer. Math. Soc. vol. 26, pages 171–175: published Trans. Amer. Math. Soc. 27 (1925) 600. MR1500497
- Bernstein, B. A. (1924). "Representation of three-element algebras". American Journal of Mathematics. 46 (2): 110–116. doi:10.2307/2370826. JSTOR 2370826.
- Bernstein, B. A. (1926). "Sets of postulates for the logic of propositions". Trans. Amer. Math. Soc. 28 (3): 472–478. doi:10.1090/s0002-9947-1926-1501359-3. MR 1501359.
- Bernstein, B. A. (1926). "On the existence of fields in Boolean algebras". Trans. Amer. Math. Soc. 28 (4): 654–657. doi:10.1090/s0002-9947-1926-1501369-6. MR 1501369.
- "On the Serial Relations in Boolean Algebras" Bulletin of the American Mathematical Society 32(5) 523,4 1926
- Bernstein, B. A. (1931). "Whitehead and Russell's theory of deduction as a mathematical science". Bull. Amer. Math. Soc. 37 (6): 480–488. doi:10.1090/s0002-9904-1931-05191-0. MR 1562173.
- Bernstein, B. A. (1931). "Application of Boolean algebra to proving consistency and independence of postulates". Bull. Amer. Math. Soc. 37 (10): 715–719. doi:10.1090/s0002-9904-1931-05242-3. MR 1562241.
- with Nemo Debely: Bernstein, B. A.; Debely, Nemo (1932). "A practical method for the modular representation of finite operations and relations". Bull. Amer. Math. Soc. 38 (2): 110–114. doi:10.1090/s0002-9904-1932-05338-1. MR 1562337.
- Bernstein, B. A. (1932). "On proposition *4.78 of Principia Mathematica". Bull. Amer. Math. Soc. 38 (6): 388–391. doi:10.1090/s0002-9904-1932-05400-3. MR 1562404.
- Bernstein, B. A. (1932). "Relation of Whitehead and Russell's theory of deduction to the Boolean logic of propositions". Bull. Amer. Math. Soc. 38 (8): 589–593. doi:10.1090/s0002-9904-1932-05464-7. MR 1562463.
- Bernstein, B. A. (1932). "On unit-zero Boolean representations of operations and relations". Bull. Amer. Math. Soc. 38 (10): 707–712. doi:10.1090/s0002-9904-1932-05507-0. MR 1562493.
- Bernstein, B. A. (1933). "Remarks on Propositions *1.1 and *3.35 of Principia Mathematica". Bull. Amer. Math. Soc. 39 (2): 111–114. doi:10.1090/s0002-9904-1933-05576-3. MR 1562562.
- Bernstein, B. A. (1933). "Simplification of the set of four postulates for Boolean algebras in terms of rejection". Bull. Amer. Math. Soc. 39 (10): 783–787. doi:10.1090/s0002-9904-1933-05738-5. MR 1562729.
- Bernstein, B. A. (1933). "On Section A of Principia Mathematica". Bull. Amer. Math. Soc. 39 (10): 788–792. doi:10.1090/s0002-9904-1933-05740-3. MR 1562730.
- Bernstein, B. A. (1934). "A set of four postulates for Boolean algebra in terms of the "implicative" operation". Trans. Amer. Math. Soc. 36 (4): 876–884. doi:10.1090/s0002-9947-1934-1501773-0. MR 1501773.
- Bernstein, B. A. (1936). "Postulates for Boolean algebra involving the operation of complete disjunction". Annals of Mathematics. 37 (2): 317–325. doi:10.2307/1968444. JSTOR 1968444.
- Bernstein, B. A. (December 1937). "Remarks on Nicod's reduction of Principia Mathematica". Journal of Symbolic Logic. 2 (4): 165–166. doi:10.2307/2268282. JSTOR 2268282. S2CID 21038928.
- Bernstein, B. A. (1938). "Postulates for abelian groups and fields in terms of non-associative operations". Trans. Amer. Math. Soc. 43: 1–6. doi:10.1090/s0002-9947-1938-1501932-0. MR 1501932.
- with Alfred L. Foster: Foster, Alfred L.; Bernstein, B. A. (September 1944). "Symmetric Approach to Commutative Rings with Duality Theorem: Boolean Duality as Special Case". Duke Mathematical Journal. 11 (3): 603–616. doi:10.1215/s0012-7094-44-01153-1.
- Bernstein, B. A. (1944). "Postulate-sets for Boolean rings". Trans. Amer. Math. Soc. 55: 393–400. doi:10.1090/s0002-9947-1944-0009944-6. MR 0009944.
- Bernstein, B. A. (1947). "Weak definitions of a field". Duke Mathematical Journal. 14 (2): 475–482. doi:10.1215/s0012-7094-47-01439-7.
