= Metasymplectic space =

In mathematics, a metasymplectic space, introduced by Freudenthal (1959) and Tits (1974, 10.13), is a Tits building of type F4 (a specific generalized incidence structure). The four types of vertices are called points, lines, planes, and symplecta.
