= Holly Krieger =

American mathematics professor

Holly Krieger is an American mathematician who is a professor in mathematics at the University of Cambridge, where she is also the Corfield Fellow at Murray Edwards College. Her current research interests are in arithmetic and algebraic aspects of families of complex dynamical systems. She is known for her appearances in the popular mathematics YouTube video series Numberphile.

== Career ==
Originally from Champaign, Illinois, Krieger holds an undergraduate degree from the University of Illinois at Urbana–Champaign and master's and Ph.D. degrees from the University of Illinois at Chicago. She completed her Ph.D. in 2013; her dissertation, Primitive prime divisors in polynomial dynamics, was jointly supervised by Laura DeMarco and Ramin Takloo-Bighash. Subsequently, she held a National Science Foundation postdoctoral fellowship at Massachusetts Institute of Technology supervised by Bjorn Poonen, and in 2016, Krieger was hired as a lecturer at the University of Cambridge. As of 2022, she is a professor of mathematics at the University of Cambridge.

== Recognition ==
In 2019, Krieger was the Australian Mathematical Sciences Institute Mahler Lecturer, which involved giving a series of seminars and public lectures across Australia. In 2020, she won a Whitehead Prize of the London Mathematical Society "for her deep contributions to arithmetic dynamics, to equidistribution, to bifurcation loci in families of rational maps, and her recent proof (with DeMarco and Ye) of uniform boundedness results for numbers of torsion points on families of bielliptic genus two curves in their Jacobians". Her work with DeMarco and Hexi Ye, "Uniform Manin–Mumford for a family of genus 2 curves", published in the Annals of Mathematics, also won the 2020 Alexanderson Award of the American Institute of Mathematics.
