= Fioralba Cakoni =

Albanian mathematician

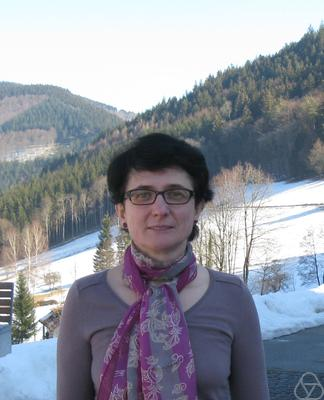
Fioralba Cakoni at the MFO, 2012

Fioralba Cakoni is an American-Albanian mathematician and an expert on inverse scattering theory. She is a professor of mathematics at Rutgers University.

== Education and career ==
Cakoni earned bachelor's and master's degrees from the University of Tirana in 1987 and 1990 respectively. She completed her Ph.D. in 1996, jointly between the University of Tirana and University of Patras, supervised by George Dassios. Her dissertation was Some Results on the Abstract Wave Equation. Problems of the Scattering Theory in Elasticity and Thermoelasticity in Low-Frequency.

She became a lecturer at the University of Tirana and then, from 1998 to 2000, a Humboldt Research Fellow at the University of Stuttgart. She came to the US for additional postdoctoral research at the University of Delaware in 2000, and stayed at Delaware as an assistant professor beginning in 2002. She moved to Rutgers University-New Brunswick in 2015 where she is now distinguished professor of mathematics. She serves on the Scientific Advisory Board for the Institute for Computational and Experimental Research in Mathematics (ICERM).

== Books ==
Cakoni is the author or coauthor of:

- Qualitative Methods in Inverse Scattering Theory (with David Colton, Springer, 2006)
- The Linear Sampling Method in Inverse Electromagnetic Scattering (with David Colton and Peter Monk, Society for Industrial and Applied Mathematics, 2011)
- A Qualitative Approach to Inverse Scattering Theory (with David Colton, Springer, 2014)
- Inverse Scattering Theory and Transmission Eigenvalues (with David Colton and Houssem Haddar, Society for Industrial and Applied Mathematics, 2016)

== Recognition ==
Cakoni was included in the 2019 class of fellows of the American Mathematical Society "for contributions to analysis of partial differential equations especially in inverse scattering theory". In 2020 Cakoni was elected foreign member of the Academy of Sciences of Albania. She was elected to the 2023 Class of SIAM Fellows.
