= Margaret Cheney (mathematician) =

American mathematician

Margaret Cheney (born 1955) is an American mathematician whose research involves inverse problems. She is Yates Chair and Professor of Mathematics at Colorado State University.

== Education and career ==
Cheney graduated from Oberlin College in 1976, with a double major in mathematics and physics. She completed her Ph.D. in 1982 at Indiana University Bloomington. Her dissertation, Quantum Mechanical Scattering and Inverse Scattering in Two Dimensions, was supervised by Roger G. Newton.

After postdoctoral study at Stanford University, Cheney took a faculty position at Duke University in 1984, and moved to the Rensselaer Polytechnic Institute in 1988. In 2012 she moved again to Colorado State University as Yates Chair.

== Recognition ==
In 2000, Cheney became the inaugural Lise Meitner Visiting Professor at Lund University.

Cheney was elected as a SIAM Fellow in 2009 "for contributions to inverse problems in acoustics and electromagnetic theory". In 2012, Oberlin College gave her an honorary doctorate.

== Selected publications ==
=== Book ===
- Cheney, Margaret; Borden, Brett (2009), Fundamentals of Radar Imaging, CBMS-NSF Regional Conference Series in Applied Mathematics, vol. 79, Society for Industrial and Applied Mathematics (SIAM), Philadelphia, PA, doi:10.1137/1.9780898719291, ISBN 978-0-898716-77-1

=== Review article ===
- Cheney, Margaret; Isaacson, David; Newell, Jonathan C. (1999), "Electrical impedance tomography", SIAM Review, 41 (1): 85–101, Bibcode:1999SIAMR..41...85C, doi:10.1137/S0036144598333613, MR 1669729

=== Research articles ===
- Cheney, M.; Isaacson, D.; Newell, J. C.; Simske, S.; Goble, J. (1990), "NOSER: An algorithm for solving the inverse conductivity problem", International Journal of Imaging Systems and Technology, 2 (2): 66–75, doi:10.1002/ima.1850020203, PMC 9997505, PMID 36909677, S2CID 26337135
- Somersalo, Erkki; Cheney, Margaret; Isaacson, David (1992), "Existence and uniqueness for electrode models for electric current computed tomography", SIAM Journal on Applied Mathematics, 52 (4): 1023–1040, doi:10.1137/0152060, MR 1174044
- Cheney, Margaret (2001), "The linear sampling method and the MUSIC algorithm", Inverse Problems, 17 (4): 591–595, Bibcode:2001InvPr..17..591C, doi:10.1088/0266-5611/17/4/301, MR 1861470, S2CID 250898259
