= Sunčica Čanić =

Croatian-American mathematician

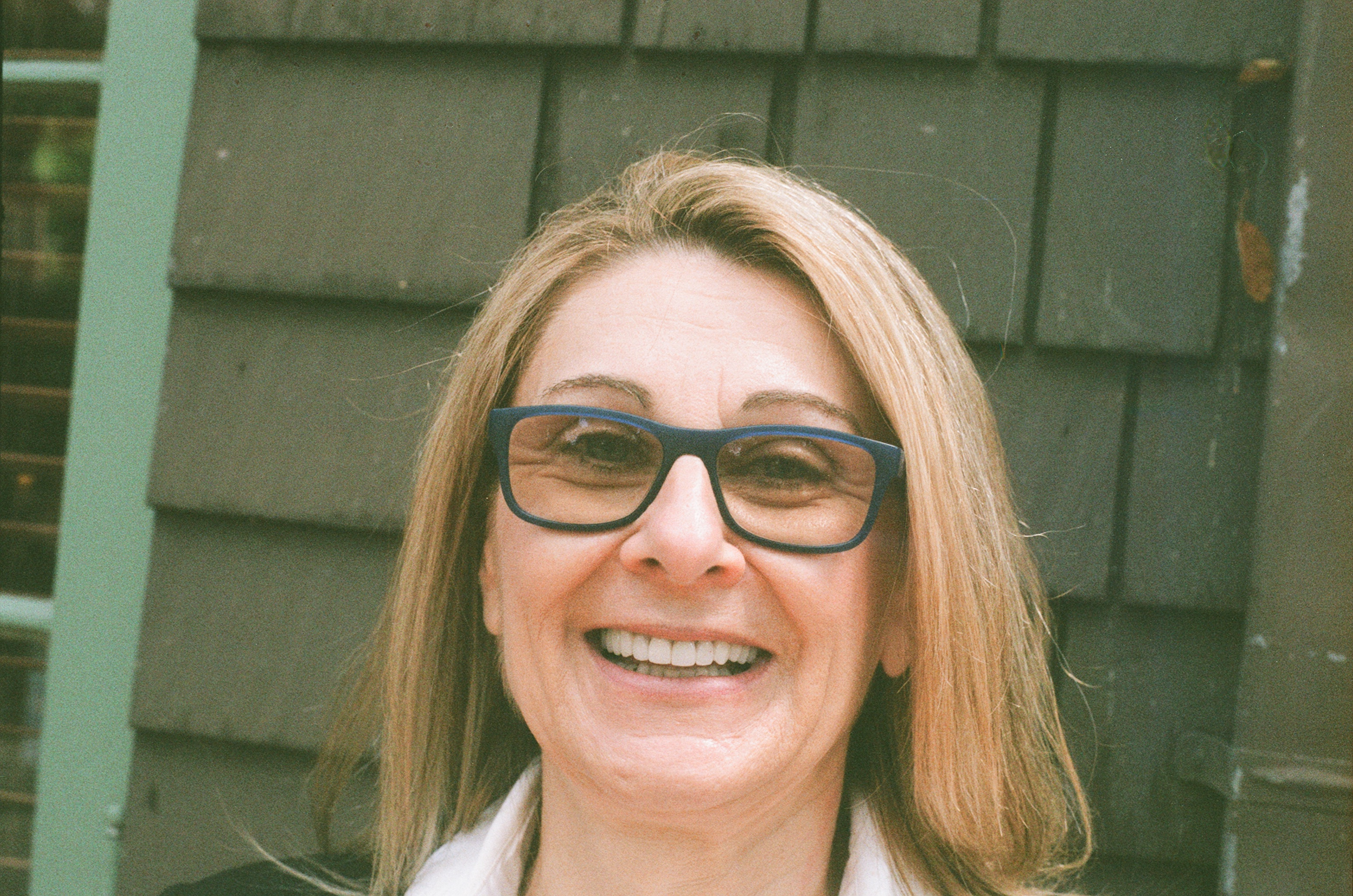
- Occupation: Professor

Academic background
- Education: University of Zagreb
- Alma mater: Stony Brook University
- Doctoral advisor: J. Plohr and James Glimm

Academic work
- Discipline: Mathematician
- Sub-discipline: Applied mathematics
- Institutions: University of Houston; University of California, Berkeley
- Main interests: Mathematical modeling the human cardiovascular system

Sunčica Čanić is a Croatian-American mathematician, the Hugh Roy and Lillie Cranz Cullen Distinguished Professor of Mathematics and Director of the Center for Mathematical Biosciences at the University of Houston, and Professor of Mathematics at the University of California, Berkeley. She is known for her work in mathematically modeling the human cardiovascular system and medical devices for it.

== Education and career ==
Čanić earned bachelor's and master's degrees in mathematics in 1984 and 1986 from the University of Zagreb. She completed her Ph.D. in 1992 in applied mathematics from Stony Brook University, under the joint supervision of Bradley J. Plohr and James Glimm. She became an assistant professor at Iowa State University in 1992, and moved to the University of Houston in 1998. She became the Cullen Distinguished Professor in 2008, and Professor of Mathematics at U.C. Berkeley in 2018. She has most recently taught the undergraduate multivariable and vector calculus course at UC Berkeley. She is also a member of the board of governors of the Institute for Mathematics and its Applications.

== Contributions ==
Čanić's research has involved the computational simulation of the stents used to treat arterial clogging. By finding ways of simplifying computer models of stents from hundreds of thousands of nodes to only 400 nodes, she was able to make these simulations much more efficient, and used them to design improved stents that reduce clotting and scar formation. She has also led the development of a procedure for heart valve replacement surgery that is less traumatic than open-heart surgery.

== Recognition ==
In 2014 she was elected as a fellow of the Society for Industrial and Applied Mathematics "for contributions to the modeling and analysis of partial differential equations motivated by applications in the life sciences." She was elected as a Fellow of the American Mathematical Society in the 2020 Class, for "contributions to partial differential equations, and for mathematical modeling of fluid-structure interactions that has influenced the design of medical devices". She was honored as the 2024 AWM-SIAM Sonia Kovalevsky Lecturer.
