= Curtis T. McMullen =

American mathematician (born 1958)

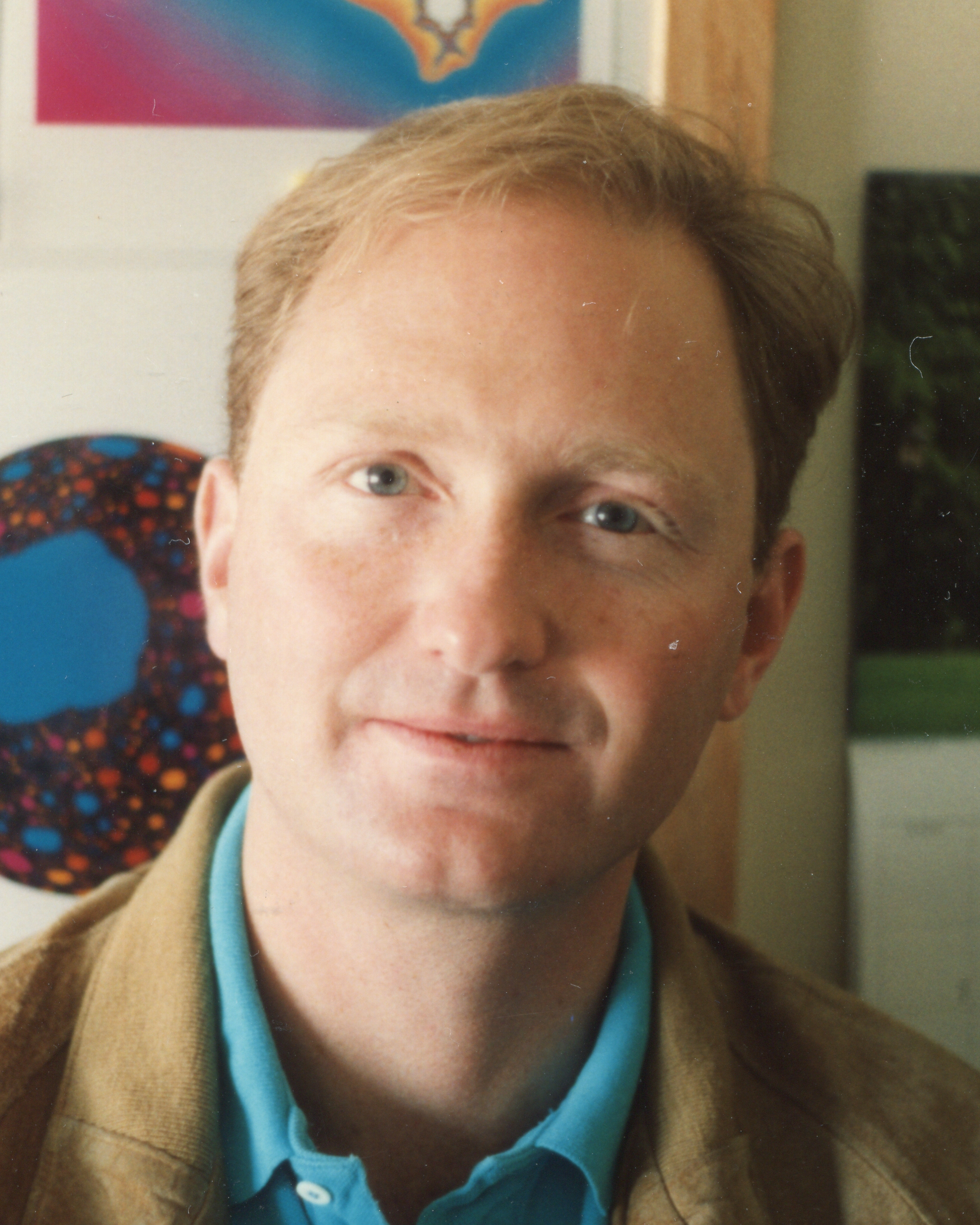
- Curtis McMullen in Berkeley, 1994
- Born: Curtis Tracy McMullen; May 21, 1958 (age 68); Berkeley, California, U.S.
- Education: Williams College (BA); Harvard University (PhD)
- Known for: Complex dynamics, hyperbolic geometry, Teichmüller theory
- Awards: Sloan Fellowship (1988); Salem Prize (1991); Fields Medal (1998); Guggenheim Fellowship (2004); Humboldt Prize (2011)
- Scientific career
- Fields: Mathematics
- Workplaces: Harvard University; Princeton University; University of California, Berkeley
- Thesis: Families of Rational Maps and Iterative Root-Finding Algorithms (1985)
- Doctoral advisor: Dennis Sullivan
- Doctoral students: Jeffrey Brock; Laura DeMarco; Jeremy Kahn; Maryam Mirzakhani; Giulio Tiozzo
- Website: math.harvard.edu/~ctm/

Curtis Tracy McMullen (born May 21, 1958) is an American mathematician who is the Cabot professor of mathematics at Harvard University. He was awarded the Fields Medal in 1998 for his work in complex dynamics, hyperbolic geometry and Teichmüller theory.

== Biography ==
McMullen graduated as valedictorian in 1980 from Williams College and obtained his PhD in 1985 from Harvard University, supervised by Dennis Sullivan. He held post-doctoral positions at the Massachusetts Institute of Technology, the Mathematical Sciences Research Institute, and the Institute for Advanced Study, after which he was on the faculty at Princeton University (1987–1990) and the University of California, Berkeley (1990–1997), before joining Harvard in 1997. McMullen was chair of the Harvard Mathematics Department from 2017 to 2020. His doctoral student Maryam Mirzakhani was the first woman to win the Fields Medal.

== Honors and awards ==
McMullen received the Salem Prize in 1991 and won the Fields Medal in 1998 at the International Congress of Mathematicians (ICM) in Berlin. At the 1990 ICM in Kyoto he was an Invited Speaker. He was awarded a Guggenheim Fellowship in 2004, elected to the National Academy of Sciences in 2007, and received the Humboldt Research Award in 2011.

== Major publications ==
- McMullen, C. T. (1987), "Families of rational maps and iterative root-finding algorithms", Annals of Mathematics, 125 (3): 467–493, doi:10.2307/1971408, JSTOR 1971408, MR 0890160
- McMullen, C. T. (1989), "Amenability, Poincaré series and quasiconformal maps", Invent. Math., 97: 95–127, Bibcode:1989InMat..97...95M, doi:10.1007/BF01850656, MR 0999314, S2CID 15729353
- McMullen, C. T. (1990), "Iteration on Teichmüller space", Invent. Math., 99: 207–216, Bibcode:1990InMat..99..425M, doi:10.1007/BF01234427, MR 1031909, S2CID 122626150
- McMullen, C. T. (1991), "Cusps are dense", Annals of Mathematics, 133 (1): 217–247, doi:10.2307/2944328, JSTOR 2944328, MR 1087348
- McMullen, Curtis T. (2000). "The Mandelbrot set is universal". In Tan, Lei (ed.). The Mandelbrot Set, Theme and Variations (PDF). Cambridge University Press. pp. 1–18.
- McMullen, C. T. (2000), "From dynamics on surfaces to rational points on curves", Bull. Amer. Math. Soc., 37 (2): 119–140, doi:10.1090/S0273-0979-99-00856-3, MR 1713286, S2CID 12036264
- McMullen, C. T. (2003), "Billiards and Teichmüller curves on Hilbert modular surfaces", J. Amer. Math. Soc., 16 (4): 857–885, doi:10.1090/S0894-0347-03-00432-6, JSTOR 30041457, MR 1992827, S2CID 7678249
- McMullen, C. T. (2005), "Minkowski's conjecture, well-rounded lattices and topological dimension", J. Amer. Math. Soc., 18 (3): 711–734, doi:10.1090/S0894-0347-05-00483-2, JSTOR 20161252, MR 2138142, S2CID 11777513
- McMullen, C. T. (2016), "Automorphisms of projective K3 surfaces with minimum entropy", Invent. Math., 203 (1): 179–215, Bibcode:2016InMat.203..179M, doi:10.1007/S00222-015-0590-Z, S2CID 253742362, Zbl 1364.37103
- McMullen, C. T.; et al. (2017), "Geodesic planes in hyperbolic 3-manifolds", Invent. Math., 209 (2): 425–461, Bibcode:2017InMat.209..425M, doi:10.1007/s00222-016-0711-3, MR 3674219, S2CID 253747261
- McMullen, C. T.; et al. (2017), "Cubic curves and totally geodesic subvarieties of moduli space", Annals of Mathematics, 185 (3): 957–990, doi:10.4007/annals.2017.185.3.6, JSTOR 26395746, MR 3664815, S2CID 1658293

== Books ==
- ——— (1994), Complex Dynamics and Renormalization, Annals of Mathematics Studies, vol. 135, Princeton, NJ: Princeton University Press, ISBN 0-691-02982-2
- ——— (1996), Renormalization and 3-Manifolds which Fiber over the Circle, Annals of Mathematics Studies, vol. 142, Princeton, NJ: Princeton University Press, ISBN 0-691-01153-2
