= George Dassios =

Greek mathematician and scholar

- George Dassios
- Born: Georgios Dassios; January 22, 1946 (age 80); Patras, Greece
- Citizenship: Greek
- Employer: University of Patras
- Children: 2

George Dassios (Greek: Γεώργιος Δάσιος) is a Greek mathematician, scholar and corresponding member of the Academy of Athens.

== Biography ==
Dassios was born in 1946, in Patras, Greece, where he attended primary and secondary education. He received his Bachelor's degree from the Department of Mathematics of the University of Athens in 1970 and continued his postgraduate studies at the University of Illinois at Chicago where he received his Master of Science in 1972 and his Ph.D. in 1975 in applied mathematics, supervised by Victor Twersky.

In 1980 he was awarded the title of Dozent of Applied Mathematics at the National Technical University of Athens. In 1981, at age of 35, he was elected a Professor at the Department of Mathematics of the University of Patras and in 1989 he accepted an invitation from the Department of Chemical Engineering at the same university.

He has taught and been invited to give research seminars at more than 120 universities mainly in the USA and Europe, but also Japan, Korea, Finland, and Brazil.

His work includes 168 research papers published in major international scientific journals. He has also authored 21 textbooks and two research monographs, one published by Oxford University Press in 2000 and one by Cambridge University Press in 2012. He has also announced more than 200 scientific papers at international conferences.

He has participated, but also led as a scientific director, dozens of research programs in Greece and abroad. He was the scientific director of the PANEGO program for early diagnosis of craniocerebral injuries and the recognition of particle shape in biological suspensions selected by the European Commission in 2003 as the most successful research project funded by the European Commission in Greece.

During the International Mathematical Olympiad, which took place in Athens, in 2004, he was chairman of the International Commission, which consisted of the leaders of all participating countries.

He has been involved for more than 25 years in University entrance examination committees of the Ministry of Education and Religious Affairs (Greece), the State Scholarship Foundation and the Supreme Council for Civil Personnel Selection. Since 2014, he has been the president of the independent National Exams Organization of the Ministry of Education and Religious Affairs (Greece).

In 2018 he was elected corresponding member of the Academy of Athens.

He is Emeritus Professor at the University of Patras and an Honorary Researcher at the Foundation for Research & Technology – Hellas.

== Honors ==
- Institute of Mathematics and its Applications, Fellow and Chartered Mathematician (1992).
- Academy of Athens, "Aristeion" Prize for his work on the problem of Magnetoencephalography in elliptical geometry (2004).
- European Commission, Marie Curie Chair of Excellence Professorship in Department of Applied Mathematics and Theoretical Physic, University of Cambridge (2005).
- Scouts of Greece, Scout Order of The Silver Phoenix (2018).
