= Laura DeMarco =

American mathematician (born 1974)

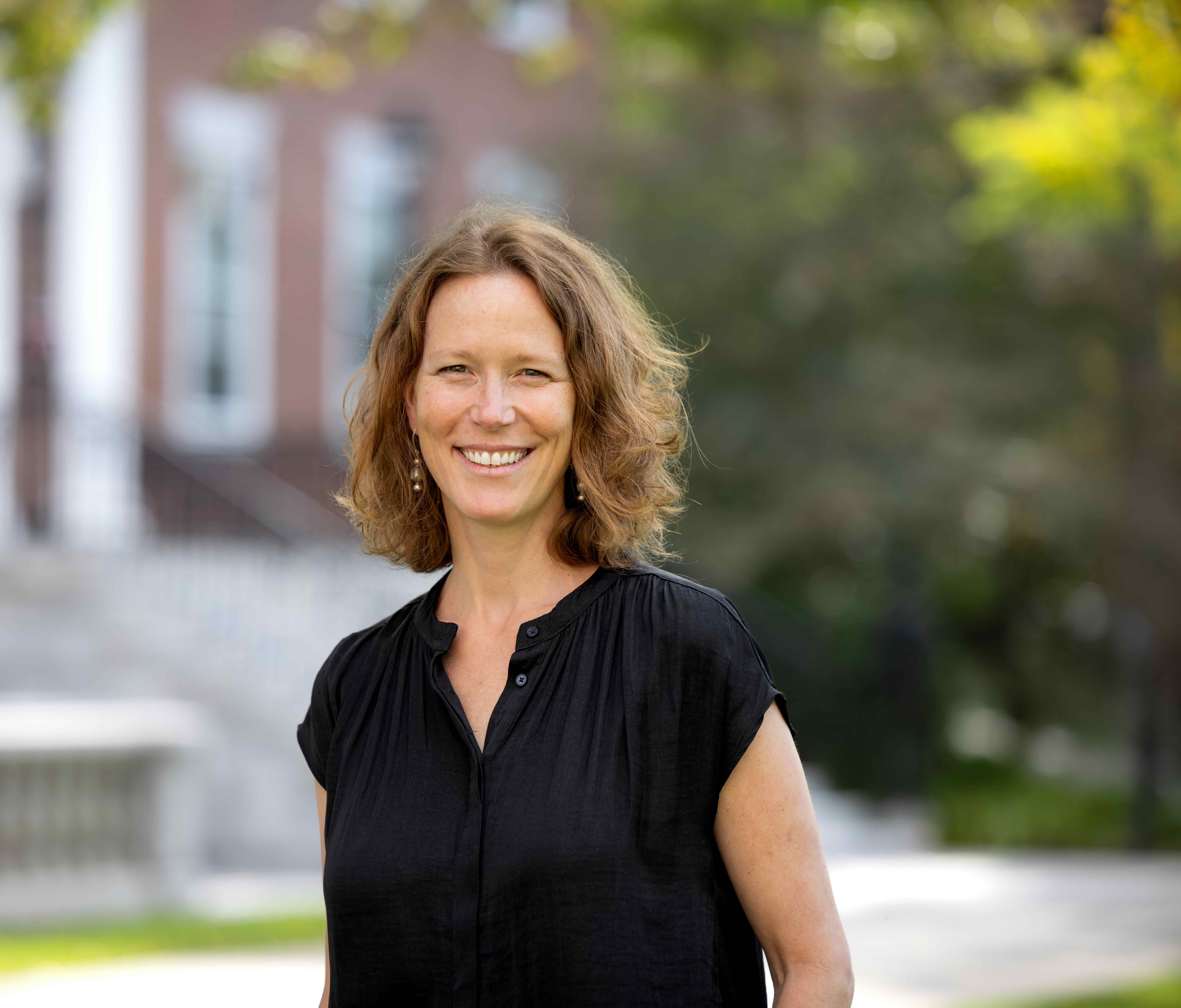
- DeMarco in 2026
- Education: Harvard University
- Awards: Fellow of the American Mathematical Society (2013); Ruth Lyttle Satter Prize in Mathematics (2017); Member of the National Academy of Sciences (2020)
- Scientific career
- Fields: Mathematics
- Workplaces: Harvard University; Northwestern University; University of Illinois at Chicago; University of Chicago
- Thesis: Holomorphic Families of Rational Maps: Dynamics, Geometry, and Potential Theory (2002)
- Doctoral advisor: Curtis McMullen
- Doctoral students: Holly Krieger

Laura Grace DeMarco is an American mathematician who is a professor of mathematics at Harvard University, whose research concerns dynamical systems and complex analysis.

== Career ==
DeMarco received her Ph.D. from Harvard University in 2002 under the supervision of Curtis T. McMullen. She held an NSF Postdoctoral Fellowship and was an L. E. Dickson Instructor at the University of Chicago from September 2002 to August 2005. She was also an assistant professor at the University of Chicago, and then she moved to the University of Illinois at Chicago, where she was tenured and promoted to professor. She moved to Northwestern University in 2014, and was promoted to Henry S. Noyes Professor of Mathematics in 2019, before she moved to Harvard University in 2020. She has been appointed the Hollis Professor of Mathematicks and Natural Philosophy as of 2026

DeMarco is an organizer of GROW (Graduate Research Opportunities for Women) undergraduate conference.

== Awards and honors ==
In 2013, DeMarco became a fellow of the American Mathematical Society in the inaugural class of fellows. In 2017, she received the AMS Ruth Lyttle Satter Prize in Mathematics in Mathematics for her contributions to complex dynamics, potential theory, and the emerging field of arithmetic dynamics. In 2020, DeMarco was elected a member of the National Academy of Sciences.

She was an invited speaker at the 2018 International Congress of Mathematicians, speaking in the section on Dynamical Systems and Ordinary Differential Equations. She is the 2023 AWM-AMS Emmy Noether Lecturer in recognition of her "fundamental and influential contributions to complex dynamics, arithmetic dynamics, and arithmetic geometry."

Her work with Holly Krieger and Hexi Ye, "Uniform Manin–Mumford for a family of genus 2 curves", published in the Annals of Mathematics, won the 2020 Alexanderson Award of the American Institute of Mathematics.

== Research ==
DeMarco's research involves algebraic, arithmetic and complex dynamics with an emphasis on their interactions with each other. She has studied dynamically meaningful compactifications of the moduli space of rational maps on $\mathbb{P}^1.$ In joint work with Curtis McMullen, she showed how simplicial metrized trees can be used to compactify the moduli space of polynomials. Together with Xander Faber, DeMarco has studied degenerations of complex dynamical systems from the viewpoint of Berkovich spaces.

With Matthew Baker, DeMarco pioneered the study of unlikely intersections in arithmetic dynamics and formulated the dynamical André-Oort conjecture. Together with Holly Krieger and Hexi Ye, DeMarco proved the first instances of the uniform dynamical Manin-Mumford conjecture for Lattès maps and for quadratic unicritical polynomials. In collaboration with Niki Myrto Mavraki, DeMarco studied the notion of non-degeneracy for polarized dynamical systems and its relation to stability. Later with Niki Myrto Mavraki and Hexi Ye, DeMarco proved a uniform version of the dynamical André-Oort conjecture.
