= Frank Harary =

American mathematician (1921–2005)

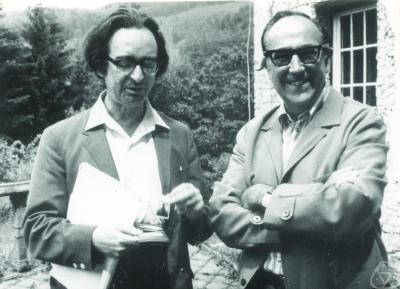
- Frank Harary (left) and Klaus Wagner in Oberwolfach, 1972
- Born: March 11, 1921; New York City, New York, US
- Died: January 4, 2005 (aged 83); Las Cruces, New Mexico, US
- Education: Brooklyn College; University of California, Berkeley
- Known for: Goldner–Harary graph Harary's generalized tic-tac-toe
- Scientific career
- Fields: Mathematics
- Workplaces: University of Michigan; New Mexico State University
- Doctoral advisor: Alfred L. Foster
- Doctoral students: L. W. Beineke; Stephen Hedetniemi; Michael Plummer

Frank Harary (March 11, 1921 – January 4, 2005) was an American mathematician, who specialized in graph theory. He was widely recognized as one of the "fathers" of modern graph theory. Harary was a master of clear exposition and, together with his many doctoral students, he standardized the terminology of graphs. He broadened the reach of this field to include physics, psychology, sociology, and even anthropology. Gifted with a keen sense of humor, Harary challenged and entertained audiences at all levels of mathematical sophistication. A particular trick he employed was to turn theorems into games—for instance, students would try to add red edges to a graph on six vertices in order to create a red triangle, while another group of students tried to add edges to create a blue triangle (and each edge of the graph had to be either blue or red). Because of the theorem on friends and strangers, one team or the other would have to win.

== Biography ==
Frank Harary was born in New York City, the oldest child to a family of Jewish immigrants from Syria and Russia. He earned his bachelor's and master's degrees from Brooklyn College in 1941 and 1945 respectively and his Ph.D., with supervisor Alfred L. Foster, from University of California, Berkeley in 1948.

Prior to his teaching career he became a research assistant in the Institute for Social Research at the University of Michigan.

Harary's first publication, "Atomic Boolean-like rings with finite radical", went through much effort to be put into the Duke Mathematical Journal in 1950. This article was first submitted to the American Mathematical Society in November 1948, then sent to the Duke Mathematical Journal where it was revised three times before it was finally published two years after its initial submission. Harary began his teaching career at the University of Michigan in 1953 where he was first an assistant professor, then in 1959 associate professor and in 1964 was appointed as a professor of mathematics, a position he held until 1986.

From 1987 he was Professor (and Distinguished Professor Emeritus) in the Computer Science Department at New Mexico State University in Las Cruces. He was one of the founders of the Journal of Combinatorial Theory and the Journal of Graph Theory.

In 1949 Harary published On the algebraic structure of knots. Shortly after this publication in 1953 Harary published his first book (jointly with George Uhlenbeck) On the number of Husimi trees. It was following this text that he began to build up a worldwide reputation for his work in graph theory. In 1965 his first book Structural models: An introduction to the theory of directed graphs was published, and for the rest of his life his interest would be in the field of graph theory.

While beginning his work in graph theory around 1965, Harary began buying property in Ann Arbor, and subdividing the houses he bought into apartments. This led to criticism for poor maintenance, "scores of building code violations", and six condemnations of buildings he owned. In a 1969 newspaper article, Harary was quoted as stating "We just wanted these properties for the land value ... we wanted to move the tenants out", while his wife Jayne stated "We've wanted to help poor blacks find better housing, but we've taken the rap again and again." Harary and his wife Jayne had six children together, Miriam, Natalie, Judith, Thomas, Joel and Chaya.

From 1973 to 2007 Harary jointly wrote five more books, each in the field of graph theory. In the time before his death, Harary traveled the world researching and publishing over 800 papers (with some 300 different co-authors), in mathematical journals and other scientific publications, more than any mathematician other than Paul Erdos. Harary recorded that he lectured in 166 different cities around the United States and some 274 cities in over 80 different countries. Harary was particularly proud that he had given lectures in cities around the world beginning with every letter of the alphabet, even including "X" when he traveled to Xanten, Germany. Harary also played a curious role in the award-winning film Good Will Hunting. The film displayed formulas he had published on the enumeration of trees, which were supposed to be fiendishly difficult.

It was in 1986 at the age of 65 that Harary retired from his professorship at the University of Michigan. Harary did not take his retirement lightly however; following his retirement Harary was appointed as a Distinguished Professor of Computer Sciences at New Mexico State University in Las Cruces. He held this position until his death in 2005. The same year as his retirement Harary was made an honorary fellow of the National Academy of Sciences, India; he also served as an editor for about 20 different journals focusing primarily on graph theory and combinatorics. It was following his retirement that Harary was elected as an honorary lifetime member of the Calcutta Mathematical Society and of the South African Mathematical Society.

He died at Memorial Medical Center in Las Cruces, New Mexico. At the time of his death in Las Cruces other members of the department of Computer Science felt the loss for the great mind that once worked beside them. The head of the department of Computer Science at the time of Harary's death Desh Ranjan had this to say, "Dr. Harary was a true scholar with a genuine love for graph theory which was an endless source of new discoveries, beauty, curiosity, surprises and joy for him till the very end of his life."

== Mathematics ==
Harary's work in graph theory was diverse. Some topics of great interest to him were:

- Graph enumeration, that is, counting graphs of a specified kind. He coauthored a book on the subject (Harary and Palmer 1973). The main difficulty is that two graphs that are isomorphic should not be counted twice; thus, one has to apply Pólya's theory of counting under group action. Harary was an expert in this.
- Signed graphs. Harary invented this branch of graph theory, which grew out of a problem of theoretical social psychology investigated by the psychologist Dorwin Cartwright and Harary.
- Applications of graph theory in numerous areas, especially to social science such as balance theory, opinion dynamics, and the theory of tournaments. Harary was co-author of John Wiley's first e-book, Graph Theory and Geography.

Among over 700 scholarly articles Harary wrote, two were co-authored with Paul Erdős, giving Harary an Erdős number of 1. He lectured extensively and kept alphabetical lists of the cities where he spoke.

Harary's most famous classic book Graph Theory was published in 1969 and offered a practical introduction to the field of graph theory. It is evident that Harary's focus in this book and amongst his other publications was towards the varied and diverse application of graph theory to other fields of mathematics, physics and many others. Taken from the preface of Graph Theory, Harary notes ...

"...there are applications of graph theory to some areas of physics, chemistry, communication science, computer technology, electrical and civil engineering, architecture, operational research, genetics, psychology, sociology, economics, anthropology, and linguistics."

Harary quickly began promoting inquiry based learning through his texts, apparent by his reference to the tradition of the Moore method. Harary made many unique contributions to graph theory as he explored more and more different fields of study and successfully attempted to relate them to graph theory. Harary's classic book Graph Theory begins by providing the reader with much of the requisite knowledge of basic graphs and then dives right into proving the diversity of content that is held within graph theory. Some of the other mathematical fields that Harary directly relates to graph theory in his book begin to appear around chapter 13, these topics include linear algebra, and abstract algebra.

Harary also made an influential contribution in the theory of social learning used in sociology and behavioral economics, deriving a criterion for consensus in John R. P. French's model of social power. This anticipated by several decades, albeit in a special case, the widely used DeGroot learning model.

== Tree square root ==
One motivation for the study of graph theory is its application to sociograms described by Jacob L. Moreno. For instance the adjacency matrix of a sociogram was used by Leon Festinger. Festinger identified the graph theory clique with the social clique and examined the diagonal of the cube of a groups’ adjacency matrix to detect cliques. Harary joined with Ian Ross to improve on Festinger's clique detection.

The admission of powers of an adjacency matrix led Harary and Ross to note that a complete graph can be obtained from the square of an adjacency matrix of a tree. Relying on their study of clique detection, they described a class of graphs for which the adjacency matrix is the square of the adjacency matrix of a tree.

- If a graph G is the square of a tree, then it has a unique tree square root
- Some vocabulary necessary to understand this proof and the methods used here are provided in Harary's The Square of a Tree: (Cliqual, unicliqual, multicliqual, cocliqual, neighborhood, neighborly, cut point, block)
- How to determine if some graph G is the square of a tree.

Iff a graph G is complete or satisfies the following 5 properties then G = T^{2}
(i) Every point of G is neighborly and G is connected.
(ii) If two cliques meet at only one point b, then there is a third clique with which they share b and exactly one other point.
(iii) There is a 1-1 correspondence between the cliques and the multicliqual points b of G such that clique C(b) corresponding to b contains exactly as many multicliqual points as the number of cliques which include b.
(iv) No two cliques intersect in more than two points.
(v) The number of pairs of cliques that meet in two points is one less than the number of cliques.

- Algorithm for finding the tree square root of a graph G.

Step 1: Find all the cliques of G.
Step 2: Let the cliques of G be C_{1},...,C_{n}, and consider a collection of multicliqual points b_{1},...,b_{n} corresponding to these cliques in accordance with condition iii. The elements of this collection are the nonendpoints of T. Find all of the pairwise intersections of the n cliques and form the graph S by joining the points b_{i} and b_{j} by a line if and only if the corresponding cliques C_{i} and C_{j} intersect in two points. S is then a tree by condition v.
Step 3: For each clique C_{i} of G, let n_{i} be the number of unicliqual points. To the tree S obtained in step 2, attach n_{i} endpoints to b_{i}, obtaining the tree T which we sought.

Once we have the tree in question we can create an adjacency matrix for the tree T and check that it is indeed the tree which we sought. Squaring the adjacency matrix of T should yield an adjacency matrix for a graph which is isomorphic to the graph G which we started with. Probably the simplest way to observe this theorem in action is to observe the case which Harary mentions in The Square of a Tree. Specifically the example in question describes the tree corresponding the graph of K_{5}

"Consider the tree consisting of one point joined with all the others. When the tree is squared, the result is the complete graph. We wish to illustrate... T^{2}$=$K_{5}"

Upon squaring the adjacency matrix of the previously mentioned tree, we can observe that the theorem does in fact hold true. We can also observe that this pattern of setting up a tree where "one point joined with all the others" will always indeed yield the correct tree for all complete graphs.

== Bibliography ==
- 1965: (with Robert Z. Norman and Dorwin Cartwright), Structural Models: An Introduction to the Theory of Directed Graphs, New York: Wiley MR 0184874
- 1967: (editor) Graph Theory and Theoretical Physics, Academic Press MR 0232694
- 1969: Graph Theory, Addison–Wesley MR 0256911
- 1971: (editor with Herbert Wilf) Mathematical Aspects of Electrical Networks Analysis, SIAM-AMS Proceedings, Volume 3, American Mathematical Society MR 0329788
- 1973: (editor) New Directions in the Theory of Graphs: Proceedings of the 1971 Ann Arbor Conference on Graph Theory, University of Michigan, Academic Press MR 0340065
- 1973: (with Edgar M. Palmer) Graphical Enumeration, Academic Press MR 0357214
- 1979: (editor) Topics in Graph Theory, New York Academy of Sciences MR 0557879
- 1984: (with Per Hage) Structural Models in Anthropology, Cambridge Studies in Social and Cultural Anthropology, Cambridge University Press MR 0738630
- 1990: (with Fred Buckley) Distance in Graphs, Perseus Press MR 1045632
- 1991: (with Per Hage) Exchange in Oceania: A Graph Theoretic Analysis, Oxford Studies in Social and Cultural Anthropology, Oxford University Press.
- 2002: (with Sandra Lach Arlinghaus & William C. Arlinghaus) Graph Theory and Geography: An Interactive E-Book, John Wiley and Sons MR 1936840
- 2007: (with Per Hage) Island Networks: Communication, Kinship, and Classification Structures in Oceania (Structural Analysis in the Social Sciences), Cambridge University Press.
