= Nathan Jacobson =

American mathematician (1910–1999)

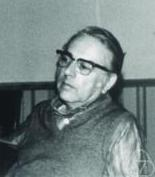
- Jacobson in 1974
- Born: October 5, 1910; Warsaw, Congress Poland, Russian Empire
- Died: December 5, 1999 (aged 89); Hamden, Connecticut
- Education: Princeton University (Ph.D. 1934); University of Alabama (B.S. 1930)
- Known for: Mathematics textbooks; Jacobson–Bourbaki theorem; Jacobson's conjecture; Jacobson density theorem; Jacobson radical; Jacobson ring
- Awards: AMS Steele Prize for Lifetime Achievement (1998)
- Scientific career
- Fields: Mathematics
- Workplaces: U.N.C. at Chapel Hill; Johns Hopkins University; Yale University
- Thesis: Non-commutative Polynomials and Cyclic Algebras (1934)
- Doctoral advisor: Joseph Wedderburn
- Doctoral students: Georgia Benkart; Charles W. Curtis; Craig Huneke; Kevin McCrimmon; George Seligman; Daya-Nand Verma; Maria Wonenburger

Nathan Jacobson (October 5, 1910 – December 5, 1999) was an American mathematician.

== Biography ==
Born Nachman Arbiser in Warsaw, Jacobson emigrated to America with his family in 1918. He graduated from the University of Alabama in 1930 and was awarded a doctorate in mathematics from Princeton University in 1934. While working on his thesis, Non-commutative polynomials and cyclic algebras, he was advised by Joseph Wedderburn.

Jacobson taught and researched at Bryn Mawr College (1935–1936), the University of Chicago (1936–1937), the University of North Carolina at Chapel Hill (1937–1943), and Johns Hopkins University (1943–1947) before joining Yale University in 1947. He remained at Yale until his retirement.

He was a member of the National Academy of Sciences and the American Academy of Arts and Sciences. He served as president of the American Mathematical Society from 1971 to 1973, and was awarded their highest honour, the Leroy P. Steele prize for lifetime achievement, in 1998. He was also vice-president of the International Mathematical Union from 1972 to 1974.

== Selected works ==
=== Books ===
- Collected Mathematical Papers, 3 vols., 1989
- The theory of Rings. 1943
- Lectures in Abstract Algebra. 3 vols., Van Nostrand 1951, 1953, 1964, Reprint by Springer 1975 (Vol.1 Basic concepts, Vol.2 Linear Algebra, Vol.3 Theory of fields and Galois theory)
- Structure of Rings. AMS 1956
- Lie Algebras. Interscience 1962
- Structure and Representations of Jordan Algebras. AMS 1968
- Exceptional Lie Algebras. Dekker 1971
- Basic Algebra. Freeman, San Francisco 1974, Vol. 1; 1980, Vol. 2; Jacobson, Nathan (1985). 2nd edition, Vol. 1. Courier Corporation. ISBN 9780486135229. Jacobson, Nathan (1989). 2nd edition, Vol. 2. Courier Corporation. ISBN 9780486135212.
- PI-Algebras. An Introduction. Springer 1975
- Finite-dimensional division algebras over fields 1996

=== Articles ===
- Jacobson, Nathan (1937). "Abstract derivation and Lie algebras". Trans. Amer. Math. Soc. 42 (2): 206–224. doi:10.1090/s0002-9947-1937-1501922-7. MR 1501922.
- "p-algebras of exponent p". Bull. Amer. Math. Soc. 43: 667–670. 1937. doi:10.1090/s0002-9904-1937-06621-3. MR 1563614.
- Jacobson, N. (1939). "An application of E. H. Moore's determinant of a hermitian matrix". Bull. Amer. Math. Soc. 45 (10): 745–748. doi:10.1090/s0002-9904-1939-07072-9. MR 0000219.
- Jacobson, N. (1940). "A note on hermitian forms". Bull. Amer. Math. Soc. 46 (4): 264–268. doi:10.1090/s0002-9904-1940-07187-3. MR 0001957.
- Jacobson, N. (1941). "Restricted Lie algebras of characteristic p". Trans. Amer. Math. Soc. 50: 15–25. doi:10.1090/s0002-9947-1941-0005118-0. MR 0005118.
- "Schur's theorem on commutative algebras". Bull. Amer. Math. Soc. 50: 431–436. 1944. doi:10.1090/s0002-9904-1944-08169-x. MR 0010540.
- "The equation $x' \equiv xd-dx=b$". Bull. Amer. Math. Soc. 50: 902–905. 1944. doi:10.1090/s0002-9904-1944-08260-8. MR 0011290.
- Jacobson, N. (1945). "Structure theory of simple rings without finiteness assumptions". Trans. Amer. Math. Soc. 57 (2): 228–245. doi:10.1090/s0002-9947-1945-0011680-8. MR 0011680.
- Jacobson, N. (1945). "The radical and semi-simplicity for arbitrary rings". Amer. J. Math. 67 (2): 300–322. doi:10.2307/2371731. JSTOR 2371731. MR 0012271.
- "Structure theory for algebras of bounded degree". Ann. Math. 46: 695–707. 1945. doi:10.2307/1969205. JSTOR 1969205. MR 0014083.
- Jacobson, N. (1945). "A topology for the set of primitive ideals in an arbitrary ring". Proc. Natl. Acad. Sci. U.S.A. 31 (10): 333–338. Bibcode:1945PNAS...31..333J. doi:10.1073/pnas.31.10.333. PMC 1078836. PMID 16588704.
- Jacobson, N. (1948). "The center of a Jordan ring". Bull. Amer. Math. Soc. 54 (4): 316–322. doi:10.1090/s0002-9904-1948-08993-5. MR 0024422.
- with F. D. Jacobson: Jacobson, F. D.; Jacobson, N. (1949). "Classification and representation of semi-simple Jordan algebras". Trans. Amer. Math. Soc. 65: 141–169. doi:10.1090/s0002-9947-1949-0029367-8. MR 0029367.
- Jacobson, Nathan (1949). "Lie and Jordan triple systems". Amer. J. Math. 71 (1): 149–170. doi:10.2307/2372102. JSTOR 2372102. MR 0028305.
- with C. E. Rickart: Jacobson, N.; Rickart, C. E. (1950). "Jordan homomorphisms of rings". Trans. Amer. Math. Soc. 69: 479–502. doi:10.1090/s0002-9947-1950-0038335-x. MR 0038335.
- Jacobson, N. (1950). "Some remarks on one-sided inverses". Proc. Amer. Math. Soc. 1 (3): 352–355. doi:10.1090/s0002-9939-1950-0036223-1. MR 0036223.
- Jacobson, N. (1951). "General representation theory of Jordan algebras". Trans. Amer. Math. Soc. 70 (3): 509–530. doi:10.1090/s0002-9947-1951-0041118-9. MR 0041118.
- Jacobson, Nathan (1951). "Completely reducible Lie algebras of linear transformations". Proc. Amer. Math. Soc. 2: 105–113. doi:10.1090/s0002-9939-1951-0049882-5. MR 0049882.
- with C. E. Rickart: Jacobson, N.; Rickart, C. E. (1952). "Homomorphisms of Jordan rings of self-adjoint elements". Trans. Amer. Math. Soc. 72 (2): 310–322. doi:10.1090/s0002-9947-1952-0046346-5. MR 0046346.
- Jacobson, N. (1952). "Operator commutativity in Jordan algebras". Proc. Amer. Math. Soc. 3 (6): 973–976. doi:10.1090/s0002-9939-1952-0051828-1. MR 0051828.
- Jacobson, N. (1955). "A note on automorphisms and derivations of Lie algebras". Proc. Amer. Math. Soc. 6 (2): 281–283. doi:10.1090/s0002-9939-1955-0068532-9. MR 0068532.
- Jacobson, N. (1955). "Commutative restricted Lie algebras". Proc. Amer. Math. Soc. 6 (3): 476–481. doi:10.1090/s0002-9939-1955-0071721-0. MR 0071721.

== See also ==
- Jacobson–Bourbaki theorem
- Jacobson's conjecture
- Jacobson density theorem
- Jacobson radical
- Jacobson ring
