= Lisa Fauci =

American mathematician (born 1960)

- Born: Lisa J. Fauci; September 21, 1960 (age 65); Brooklyn, New York
- Education: Courant Institute of Mathematical Sciences at New York University
- Awards: Fellow of the Society for Industrial and Applied Mathematics (2012); Sonia Kovalevsky Lecturer (2016); Fellow of the American Physical Society (2018); Fellow of the American Mathematical Society (2020); Tulane 2023 Hall of Fame Winner (2023)
- Scientific career
- Fields: Mathematician; Mathematical Biologist
- Workplaces: Tulane University
- Doctoral advisor: Charles S. Peskin

Lisa J. Fauci (born September 21, 1960) is an American mathematician who applies computational fluid dynamics to biological processes such as sperm motility and phytoplankton dynamics. More generally, her research interests include numerical analysis, scientific computing, and mathematical biology. She is the Pendergraft Nola Lee Haynes Professor of Mathematics at Tulane University, and was president of the Society for Industrial and Applied Mathematics (2019–2020). She was elected to the National Academy of Sciences in 2023.

== Education ==
Fauci was born in Brooklyn, New York. She did her undergraduate studies at Pace University, where she was encouraged to continue in mathematics by her mentor there, Michael Bernkopf. After earning a B.S. in mathematics in 1981, she went on to graduate studies at the Courant Institute of Mathematical Sciences of New York University, completing a master's degree in 1984 and her doctorate in 1986, under the supervision of Charles S. Peskin.

== Career ==
Fauci has been at Tulane University since 1986.

== Recognition ==
In 2012 Fauci became a fellow of the Society for Industrial and Applied Mathematics "for contributions to computational biofluid dynamics and applications." From 2014 to 2016, Fauci served as a Council Member at Large for the American Mathematical Society. In 2016 she was selected as the annual Sonia Kovalevsky Lecturer by the Association for Women in Mathematics. In 2018, she became a Fellow of the American Physical Society.

In 2019 Fauci was elected fellow of the American Association for the Advancement of Science (AAAS). She was elected as a Fellow of the American Mathematical Society in the 2020 Class, for "contributions to computational fluid dynamics and applications, and for service to the applied mathematical community".

Fauci was elected to the 2023 class of fellows of the Association for Women in Mathematics "for her vision of advancing women in the mathematical sciences; for executing that vision by encouraging women to pursue graduate studies and providing sustained mentorship throughout their careers; and for opening pathways for the broader inclusion of women through her leadership in international organizations such as SIAM." She was elected to the National Academy of Sciences in 2023. In November 2023, Fauci was a Tulane 2023 Hall of Fame winner. She is a speaker of the IBS Biomedical Mathematics Group.
